= Bunmei-kaika =

Westernization in Japan during the Meiji era (1868–1912)

Horse-drawn streetcars in Ginza, woodblock print by Hiroshige III (1882)

Bunmei-kaika (Japanese: 文明開化, lit. 'civilization and enlightenment') refers to the phenomenon of Westernization in Japan during the Meiji era (1868–1912), which led to major changes in institutions and customs. The term is generally used for the period in the early Meiji era when customs and manners changed drastically from the feudal society of the past. Under the influence of scholars such as Fukuzawa Yukichi, it was thought that adopting Western culture would allow Japan to overcome the perceived weaknesses of its traditional culture.

== Etymology ==
The term bunmei-kaika was used as a translation of "civilization" in Fukuzawa Yukichi's book An Outline of a Theory of Civilization (文明論之概略, Bunmei-ron no Gairyaku). Originally, only bunmei (文明) was translated as "civilization" in Japan. However, the word kaika (開化) is now also widely used to mean "civilization". Kaika originally meant "the action of making someone understand reason or principle and guiding them to good direction" in Buddhism. In the Edo period though, the Tokugawa family used the verb akeru (開ける, 'to open') to refer to the development of a nation, so kaika, which shares the kanji 開, gained a meaning like "development". Both bunmei and kaika are kango.

== Background of Meiji era ==
The main impetus for the bunmei-kaika was the Meiji Restoration, a series of huge changes that occurred in Japan in the latter half of the 19th century.

From 1639 to 1854, Japan was closed to other countries under a policy called sakoku. The Tokugawa shogunate implemented foreign policies such as banning the voyage to Christian countries, banning the arrival of Spanish and Portuguese into Japan, and cutting relations with Southeast Asia. Japan was effectively isolated from other countries.

In 1854, Commodore Perry visited Uraga to ask for the opening of the country to the world, which resulted in the Treaty of Peace and Amity between the United States and Japan. This opening was due to gunboat diplomacy initiated by the US, defined by issuing explicit ultimatum with threat of navel power to coerce negation for political and/or economic gain. Although the US opened more major trade, following into the Meiji period, Japan favored more European models of modernization rather then from the United States. This ended the policy of sakoku. As a result, people in Japan became more aware of the need to protect their country, and the idea of sonnō jōi was born.

At the same time, the idea of overthrowing the Shogunate spread. Many people demanded Tokugawa Yoshinobu, the Shogun at the time, to return all powers to the Emperor. In an event called the Taisei Hōkan (大政奉還), the Tokugawa Shogunate agreed to give up its powers. After this, a new government was officially established.

In 1868, Tokugawa forces and the new Meiji government's forces, composed of the Satsuma and Chōshū clans, fought in the Boshin War. The Meiji forces defeated the Tokugawa forces, and the new government took power in Japan. The government moved the capital from Kyoto to Tokyo and began to build a centralized state around the Emperor. The Meiji government abolished the han system. Emperor Meiji also announced the Charter Oath. In this way, the Meiji government steadily came to hold greater political power. The feudal system in Japan collapsed at this time. The new government introduced new systems following the example of foreign countries, especially Germany, and established a new governance system.

During this period (1866-1879), Fukuzawa published the first major textbook on the West, Seiyō Jijō. The ten volumes of this book included examples of Western civilization across many dimensions, including government, literature, technology, and more.

== Overview of phenomenon ==
A famous saying that symbolizes this era is: "If you tap a head with hair cropped short (散切り, zangiri), you will hear the sound of civilization." This saying shows that Western hairstyles were a symbol of civilization.

The new Meiji government promoted a series of policies encouraging new industries, increasing economic and military power, and following Western Europe, which included the introduction of Western architecture (Giyōfū architecture), haircutting, Western clothing, and Western food. However, it has also been pointed out that this Westernization was limited to urban areas and a few intellectuals. In some rural areas, lights were andon until the Shōwa period. The introduction of a modern mail system and technologies using electricity, such as the telegraph, was very gradual. The traditions and customs of the late Edo period continued for a long time.

Since the opening of Japan to the outside world, Japanese customs were reported from a curious perspective by foreigners who visited Japan. In order for the new Japan to not be misunderstood, the Meiji government called Japan's indigenous customs and beliefs "bad" and "old" and took policies to "enlighten" the "lost mongrel" people. Local governments took the initiative to eliminate folk customs, and many of these customs were reduced or discontinued due to the effects of bunmei-kaika. For example, along with the abandonment of Buddhism, the Ministry of Education disallowed Yamabushi, Shamanism, and other forms of blessing prayer in 1873. In addition, tattoos and Iomante were banned, affecting Ainu culture and Ryukyuan culture. In 1872, the Tokyo Prefecture issued an ordinance (違式詿違條例, ishiki kaii jōrei) which established detailed regulations to discourage a number of behaviors that the government regarded as contrary to public hygiene, safety, order, and decency.

In addition, part of the rapid Westernization was a sense of crisis over the fact that the Western powers were actively managing colonies at the time, siphoning off vast amounts of wealth from Asian countries. In this context, Western military technology was actively introduced as part of the new military policy, and even the rations served in the military were Westernized in order to increase the strength and stamina of the soldiers. However, the Imperial Japanese Armed Forces, which had just been established at that time, were a group of second and third generation soldiers from rural areas, and some of them, who had been brought up on cooked rice and Japanese food, showed aversion to the foreign Western cuisine. For this reason, the Navy and other naval forces devised ways to combine rice and curry, and developed eclectic dishes such as nikujaga with soy sauce. The Japanese curry rice later became Yokosuka navy curry. Dishes like nikujaga spread to areas around military ports, and by the time of the Showa era, it was widely accepted as a common family dish.

Japanese people were fascinated by Western culture at this time. However, different classes of people had different attitudes toward bunmei-kaika. For peasants who were of relatively low rank, taxes became a heavy burden, and anti-policy riots called ikki (一揆) occurred.

Westernization changed the way people thought. In Japan, where society was strongly divided, bunmei-kaika led to the abolition of the class system and the spread of the idea that all people were equal. People called eta (穢多, 'abundance of defilement' or 'abundance of filth') and hinin (非人), who were not treated as human beings, came to be recognized as citizens. Although this did not makes the citizens perfectly equal, the idea that people should have democratic government was born.

== Changes from bunmei-kaika ==
Many things from the West came into Japan. Imported items included Western umbrellas, shampoo, Western clothing, Western-style buildings, gas lamps, and even schools, newspapers, magazines, and semi-Western-style buildings. These were called kaika-mono (開化物).

=== Legislation ===
- Conscription — There was a conscription system in Japan. However, the conscription system changed from the French type to the German type. Due to a misunderstanding of this system, the blood tax riots occurred. The uneducated former peasants thought that they had to pay blood as tax.
- Personal names — In 1875, a decree was promulgated requiring commoners to obtain surnames. Later, in 1898 (Meiji 31), the Civil Code required the same surname for married couples, which led to today's marital surname issue.

=== Transportation and communication ===
- Railroad — The Nippon Railway company (日本鉄道会社, Nihon tetudou gaisya) was founded in 1881. The first railway opened between Shinbashi and Yokohama in 1872, and steam locomotives began service. It was called "land steam", as opposed to a steamboat. The new technology and culture of railways surprised people at that time and became a symbol of bunmei-kaika.
- Horsecar — In 1882, Japan's first Tokyo horse-drawn railroad opened. It was later converted to a tram and became the predecessor of the current Tokyo Toden.
- Rickshaw
- Steamship
- Electrical telegraph
- Post system — started in 1871 as a route between Tokyo and Osaka, then nationwide the following year in 1872.

=== Architecture and cities ===
Buildings were built in a semi-Western style, using bricks for walls. A lot of buildings were designed by foreign architects. The British architect Josiah Conder designed the Rokumeikan, which became a key diplomatic building. Gradually, the number of Japanese architects increased, and an architect named Tatsuno Kingo designed a number of Western-style buildings. Tokyo Station is one such example.

Other examples of Western-style architecture are the Tsukiji Hotel Building (築地ホテル館, Tsukiji Hoteru-kan) and Ginza Bricktown.

=== Government-owned factories ===
- Tomioka Silk Mill — started operation in 1872.

=== Clothing ===
- A hair-cutting order was issued in 1871.
- Sword Abolishment Edict
- Military uniform
- Western clothing
- Western-style umbrella (蝙蝠傘; lit. 'bat umbrella')

=== Food ===
There were major changes in Japanese food culture, such as eating sukiyaki as described in Kanagaki Robun's The Beef-eater (安愚楽鍋, Anguraku Nabe). Before, there was no culture of eating non-seafood meat in Japan because of a Buddhist belief that the meat of animals was impure. However, in order to promote eating meat, meat was actively used in the Emperor's meals from 1871. When this was reported in newspapers or magazines, meat-eating was encouraged throughout the country.

Imports of coffee and butter also started around this time, but these foods did not become very popular in Japan. In 1872, Japanese started brewing and selling beer in Osaka for the first time. In 1877, it was shipped to Tokyo, and at one time nearly 100 beer companies were established. Other changes included drinking milk and the invention of anpan.

=== Education ===
- Enforcement of the school system (学制)
  - Randoseru
  - English language education
- Dispatch of students abroad — Tsuda Umeko

=== Journalism and publishing ===
- Newspapers
- Meiroku magazine
- Translation of Western books

=== Performing arts ===
- Theater Improvement Movement (演劇改良運動, engeki kairyō undō)
- Shingeki

=== Finance ===
The government tried to solve a currency shortage by using coins and bills of the former period. Later, the gold standard system was introduced, and the Sinka Jourei (新貨条例) was enacted in 1871 so that gold could be used as an international currency. In addition, the government, which wanted to unify the monetary system following the example of the United States, enacted the Kokuritu Ginkou Jourei (国立銀行条例). In 1879, as many as 153 national banks were established across the country and were granted the right to issue paper money under certain conditions.

=== Calendar ===
- Gregorian calendar — The Tenpō calendar was used until December 2, 1872, and the following day was changed to January 1, 1873, of the Gregorian calendar.

=== Foreigners for hire ===
- Edward S. Morse — discovered the Omori Shell Mounds
- William S. Clark — vice principal of Sapporo Agricultural College

== Bunmei-byō ==
By the turn of the century, the bunmei-kaika, as both a goal and a process, had prompted criticism from those within Japanese society who considered the movement not to have brought "civilization and enlightenment" but "civilization disease" (bunmei-byō). Critics such as Miyake Setsurei and his circle derided the movement's negative effects on Japanese culture, namely decadence, materialism, radicalism, the commercialization of values and the decline of cooperation. The introduction of German economic thought in the 1890s influenced the way some Japanese perceived industrialization and its problems, including class conflict, labor strife, and the destruction of the peasant village.

== See also ==
- Japanese civilization
- Meiji Restoration
- Foreign settlement
- Foreign government advisors in Meiji Japan
- Orientalism
- Haitō Edict
- Kaika-e
- Self-Strengthening Movement — a similar phenomenon in China during the same time

== Bibliography ==
- Takenori, Oku (1993). Civilization and Enlightenment and People: A Fragment of Modern Japanese Spiritual History. Shinhyoron. ISBN 4794801963.
