= Kaika-e =

Japanese woodblock print genre

Kaika-e (Japanese: 開化絵) is a genre of Japanese woodblock prints (ukiyo-e) during the Meiji period that celebrated the Westernization of Tokyo and its people.

== Etymology ==
The term "kaika" comes from political slogan "bunmei-kaika", which means "civilization and enlightenment" in Japanese, and refers to the phenomenon of Westernization in Japan during the Meiji era (1868–1912), which led to major changes in institutions and customs. In 1868, the city of Edo was renamed Tokyo. Kaika-e prints became popular in 1870–1880, and celebrated Westernization of Tokyo and its people. Production of kaika-e prints was encouraged by the government through the Ministry of Education.

== Themes ==
Monika Hinkel writes about three major themes of kaika-e: new architecture, changes in clothing and hair fashion, new modes of transport. Kaiko-e is continuation of traditional genre meisho-e (depictions of scenic views). Another ukiyo-e genre of that era is Yokohama-e, depictions of foreigners in the harbour city of Yokohama.

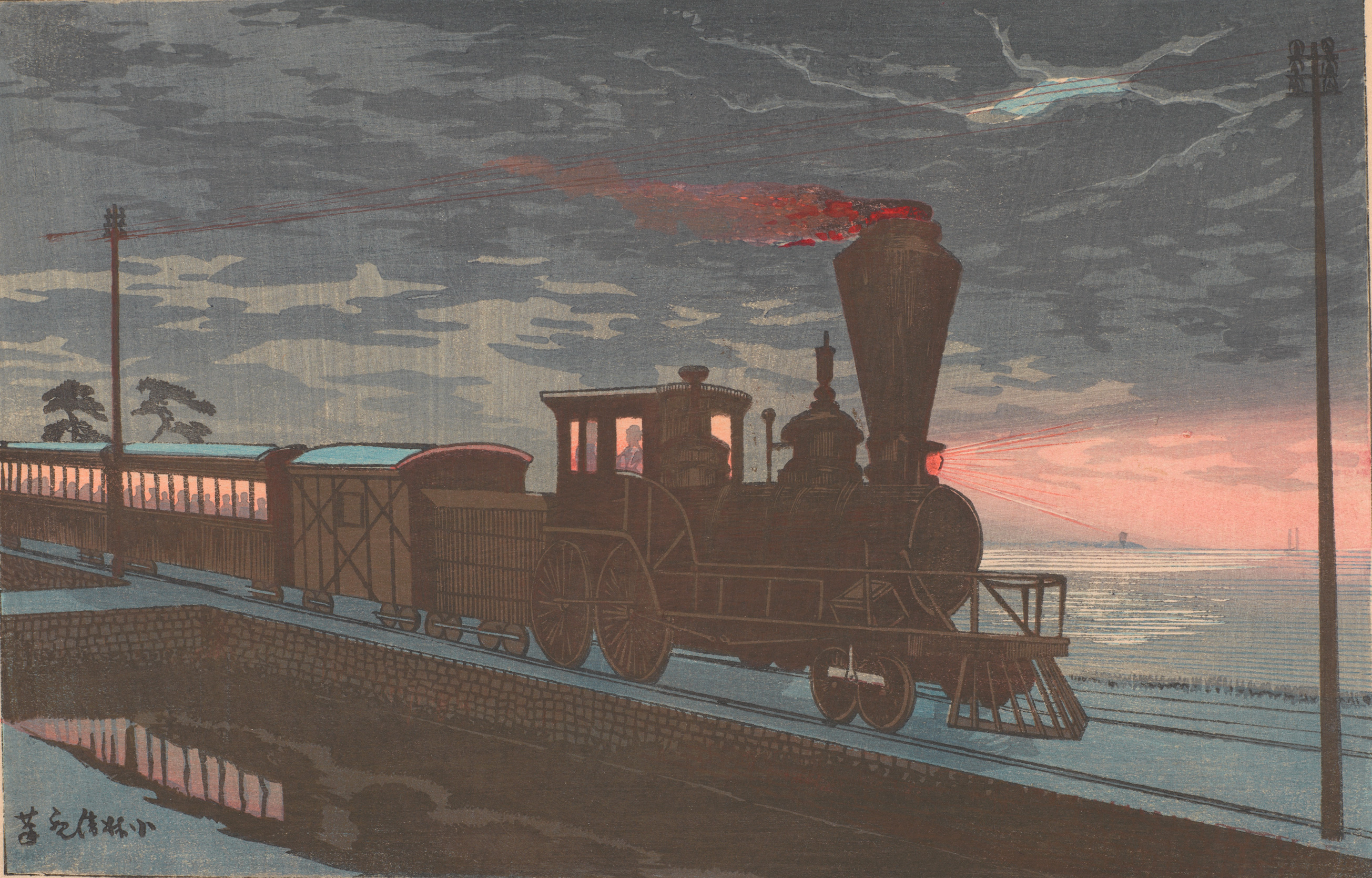
View of Takanawa Ushimachi under a Shrouded Moon by Kobayashi Kiyochika (1879)

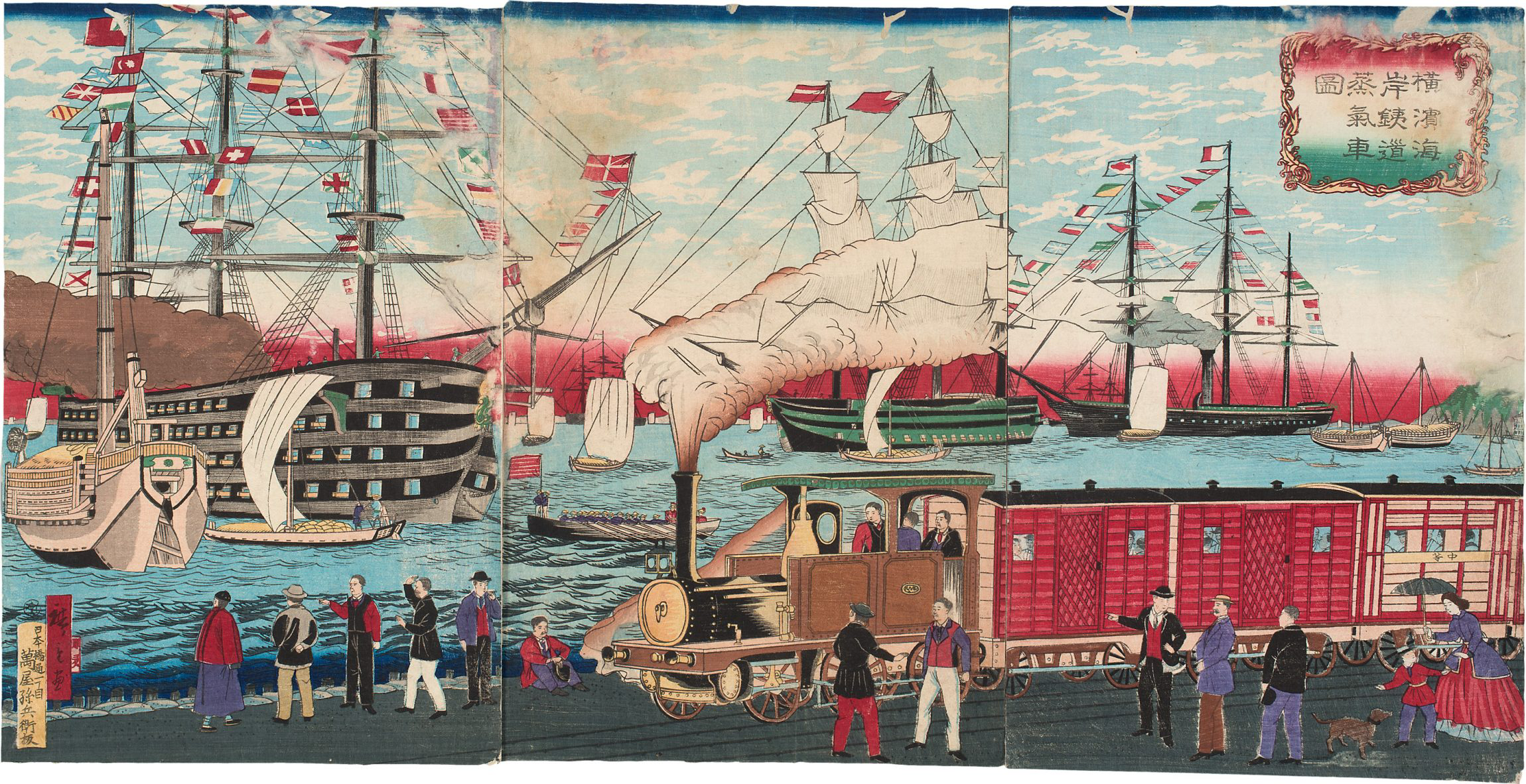
View of a steam locomotive on the railway on the coast of Yokohama by Utagawa Hiroshige III (1874)

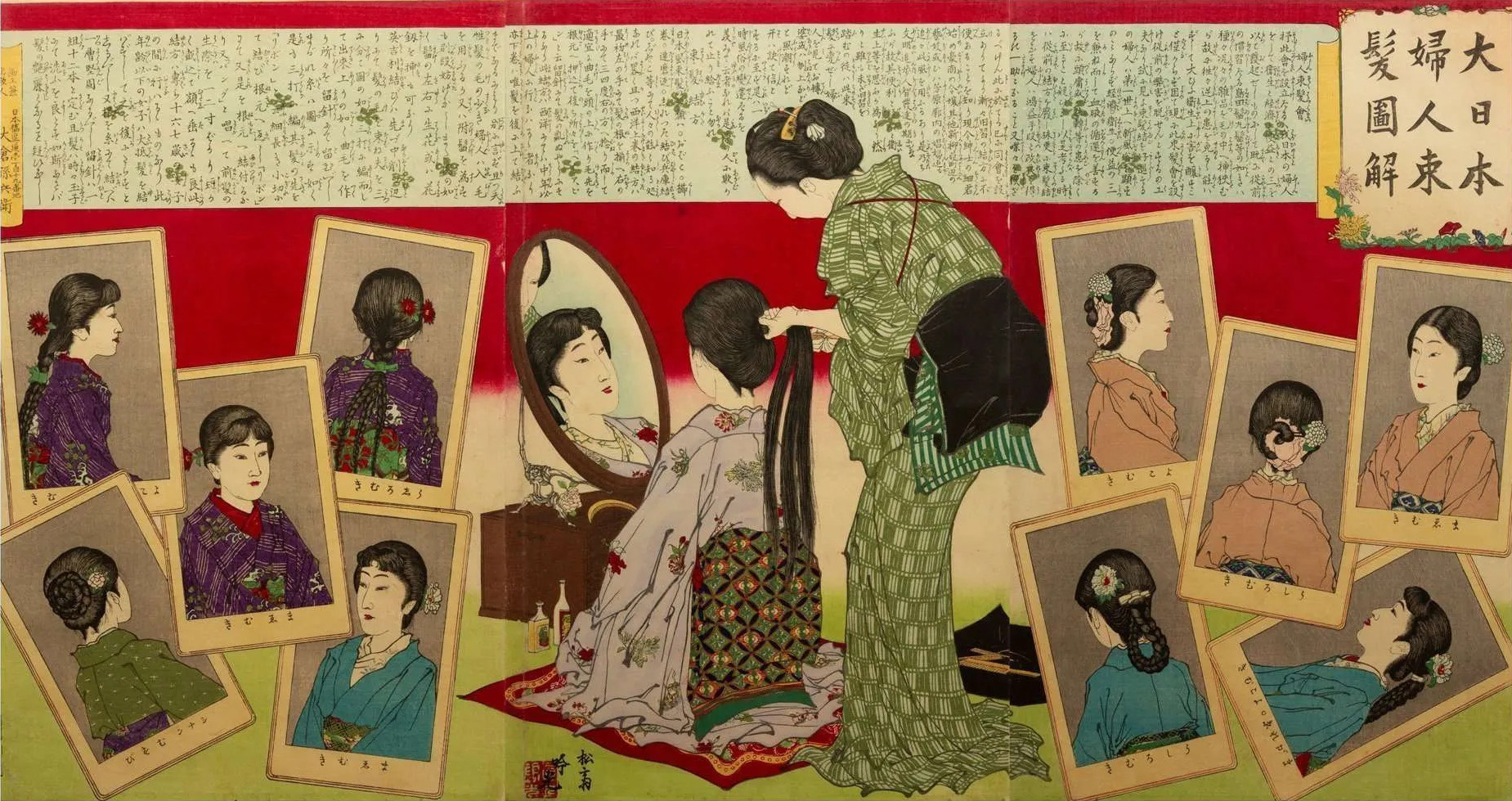
An Illustrated Explanation Of Japanese Women's Hairstyles by Adachi Ginkō (1885)
