= March to Modernity =

The March to Modernity, coined by Kishore Mahbubani in his 2008 book, "The New Asian Hemisphere: The Irresistible Shift of Global Power to the East", refers to Asia's modernization using and adapting the seven pillars of Western ideology, causing Asia to rise and to become the new global power. Asia's modernity was first achieved by Japan and India. Japan's success was emulated by the four economic tigers: South Korea, Taiwan, Hong Kong, and Singapore. China followed soon after by launching its "Four Modernizations" program. China's success of the past three decades in turn inspired the rise of India. Asians are marching to modernity.

== Overview ==
Kishore Mahbubani used the term in his book, The New Asian Hemisphere: The Irresistible Shift of Global Power to the East. March to Modernity indicates the first and most likely of the three possible scenarios of Asia's modernization in the globalization era. Mahbubani discusses how the rise of Asia will alter the world between the East and the West in the next fifty years. He argues that the modernizing Asia will be good for the whole world in ethical as well as political terms. The West (primarily America), a pioneer of the globalization and modernization, has triggered Asian modernization. The desire of Asian states is simply to follow, not to dominate West, which refers to rather the triumph of the West. However, many Western leaders made remarks defining the coming world of rising Asia as dangerous or challenging. (President Bush in 2006, French minister of foreign affairs Barnier in 2005, etc.) This conception is out-dated. The Asian March to Modernity represents a new opportunity both for the West and for the world.

== Scenario 1: March to Modernity ==
Kishore Mahbubani's main argument and first scenario is when the March to Modernity succeeds, the world would become more peaceful, stable and prosperous.

Mahbubani's first argument is that the March to Modernity will have a positive co-relational relationship in which modernization of material gains will cause Asia to experience a positive psychological boost. By gaining access to the modernization of the three basic human needs of shelter, water, and electricity, the poor of the Asian hemisphere will experience a boost in hope for a better life. Mahbubani uses the example of India's recent liberalization and shows that in the past decade poor, rural Indians feel more hopeful due to the increase in modernization. The satisfied people will also as stated by Mahbubani have a greater sense of self-dignity. Taking South Korea for example, people feel more liberated and full of hope for the future because they have numerous choices and several possibilities to choose from.

Second, entering the modern universe inevitably leads to a greater adherence to the rule of law. Mahbubani argues this point by explaining that through increase of material wealth a greater presence of law will occur, thus creating a sense of ownership and certainty. Through democratization, empowered humans will become responsible in setting world history in a positive direction due to the belief that they have the ability to control their destiny. Lastly, Mahbubani explains that the March to Modernity will also lead to a more ethical universe. Larger shares of the population will be lifted out of absolute poverty, followed by social benefits such as improvements in health and education and a decrease in crime rates. For instance, ideas of Western secular education that emphasizes economy and society are taught in China while the pages of socialism ideas are reduced. According to Mahbubani, the Chinese government spends more money and effort on child education with a heavy bias towards science and technology. However a decade ago, previous education focused on Chinese dynasties and communist revolution rather than globalization. Adopting free-market economy not only gave China progression in economic activity as well as liberated the minds of Chinese people. Mahbubani believes that the success of North America and the European Union was caused by the middle class who are reluctant to sacrifice their comfortable life due to warfare. When disputes between individuals and societies emerge, they would be settled on the basis of agreed rules and procedures, not by warfare. According to Larry Summers, “there can be no personal freedom without personal security”. Therefore, the March to Modernity creates a more secure world due to adherence to rules and order.

Examples of Economic Prosperity in Asia

• Modernization of China and India has succeeded in reducing the number of people in absolute poverty.

• "Spread of Cell phone users in India has changed Indian mindset on modern instruments. This “mobile miracle” empowered the less fortunate to fight poverty and to be connected to the global economy. Cell phones are now connecting the World's poor to the global economy, which leads to higher productivity".

Examples of Political Stability in Asia

• China has actively responded to the call of the World Bank to become a "responsible stakeholder" in the international order (Sept. 2005).

• Most Asian countries want to take responsible parts in the open multilateral international order.

== Other two possible scenarios ==
=== Scenario 2: The Retreat into Fortresses ===
In the second scenario, Mahbubani believes that the Western hemisphere, will become threatened by Asia's success. Thus, the West will engaged in rigid protectionism to halt Asia's rising status. However, Mahbubani explains that Europe has engaged in protectionist techniques since the end of the Cold War. These strategies includes massive subsidies to the wealthy few in Europe and using tax payers’ dollars on unnecessary language translations. Although the European Union's protectionist policies has not hindered the overall growth of the global economy, according to David Hale, a Wall Street journalist,“the greatest threat to this [global] boom is that the United States will lose confidence in the free market ideology". Protectionism is also happening in the investment sector of global politics. The United States has backed out of foreign investment due to the concern of national security issues. Paul Krugman, one of America's leading economist acknowledges that free trade is not universally beneficial in that there will be some winners and some losers. However the World Bank, states that countries that engaged in free trade will actually see a rise in their economies as well due to the laws of comparative advantage.

=== Scenario 3: The Triumph of the West ===
The Triumph of the West is the last scenario presented by Mahbubani. The West, having positioned itself as a superpower after the Cold War, Westernization will increase thus causing all other nations to adopt Western values and become "cultural clones of the West".

This argument was elaborated by Francis Fukuyama in his book "The End of History" arguing for the "end point of mankind's ideological evolution and the universalization of Western liberal democracy as the final form of human government". Mahbubani contends that three fundamental flaws exists in this scenario.

The first flaw is the belief that the West had triumphed over the Soviet Union because of its values and political system. Mahbubani illustrates it was the economic system that led to Western triumph, and the success of China and the failure of Soviet Union reveal the flaw of the argument. Deng Xiaoping focused on introducing free-market economics to China by correctly understanding the source of Western strength, while Gorbachev focused on glasnost (political openness) over perestroika (economic restructuring). In other words, Gorbachev's failure to realize the power of Western economic system led to the collapse of the Soviet Union.

The belief that "any society anywhere in the world at any state of social and economic development could be immediately transformed overnight into a liberal democracy" is the second flaw of the Western triumphalist thesis. The author points out that everywhere else apart from the East European countries, which shared common history and culture with Western Europe, democratization failed. He offers the example of the Balkans to argue that "without the right institutions and political culture, long-smoldering ethnic, religious, and nationalistic sentiments in many countries can be whipped up by opportunistic demagogues", leading to failure in transition to democracy. Although democratic elections were held in Croatia and Serbia, instead of liberal democrats, nationalist demagogues were elected. The leaders then appealed to visceral nationalist sentiments to retain their power, which led to war. Unprepared democratization can also lead to internal ethnic conflicts, as illustrated by the ethnic cleansing of Croats in parts of the former Yugoslavia, the attacks on the Chinese minority in Indonesia, and the Tutsi slaughter in Rwanda.

Lastly, disregarding cultural differences by believing that the model of Western liberal democratic society is universally applicable to all societies is another flaw in the triumphant post-Cold War thesis. Mahbubani claims that cultures are different and failing to see this shows generosity but also arrogance of the West. The author asserts that there is nothing superior about the Western values, rather, other dormant cultures simply underwent revival of cultural confidence and dynamism when the West was experiencing one of its most triumphant moments. Based on the flaws, Kishore Mahbubani argues that this scenario is least likely to happen in the future.

== Reasons for Asia's rise ==
In his book, The New Asian Hemisphere, Kishore Mahbubani explains seven pillars of Western wisdom that have contributed to Asia's march to modernity:

1. Free-market economics
2. Science and technology
3. Meritocracy
4. Pragmatism
5. Culture of peace
6. Rule of law
7. Education

== Cases of Asia's modernity ==
Kishore Mahbubani suggests two significant cases of Asia's modernity; China and India.

- China

According to 'The China Modernization Report', China measures its modernization level with two assessment criteria; first stage, "industrialization and urbanization" and second stage, a "knowledge-driven and information-driven" society. The 2007 China Modernization Report predicts that by 2015, China will have reached modernization "to the level of developed nations in 1960".

- India

The mobile phone revolution in India shows how "just one modern instrument" impacts modernization. It is not just the spread of mobile phones but the spread of communication and information.

== See also ==
- Kishore Mahbubani
- Modernity
- Reform and opening up
- India
- Free Market
- Larry Summers
- Poverty
- David Hale (economist)
- Paul Krugman

== Further reading on K. Mahbubani ==
- Can Asians Think? Understanding the Divide Between East and West, Steerforth, 2001, ISBN 978-1-58642-033-8; Times Editions; 3rd edition, 2004, ISBN 978-981-232-789-5
- Beyond the Age of Innocence: Rebuilding Trust Between America and the World, Perseus Books Group, 2005, ISBN 978-1-58648-268-8
- The Great Convergence: Asia, the West, and the Logic of One World, PublicAffairs, 2013

== Further related reading ==
- Francis Fukuyama, The End of History and the Last Man, The National Interest, 1992 ISBN 0-413-77270-5
