= Westernization =

Global adoption of western culture and values

Westernization (or Westernisation, see spelling differences), also Europeanisation or occidentalization (from the Occident), is a process whereby societies come under or adopt what is considered to be Western culture, in areas such as industry, technology, science, education, politics, economics, lifestyle, law, norms, mores, customs, traditions, values, mentality, perceptions, diet, clothing, language, writing system, religion, and philosophy. During colonialism, it often involved the spread of Christianity. A related concept is Northernization, which is the consolidation or influence of the Global North.

Westernization has been a growing influence across the world in the last few centuries, with some thinkers assuming Westernization to be the equivalent of modernization, a way of thought that is often debated. The overall process of Westernization is often two-sided in that Western influences and interests themselves are joined with parts of the affected society, at minimum, to become a more Westernized society, with the putative goal of attaining a Western life or some aspects of it, while Western societies are themselves affected by this process and interaction with non-Western groups.

After contact, changes in cultural patterns are evident within one or both cultures. Specific to Westernization and the non-Western culture, foreign societies tend to adopt changes in their social systems relative to Western ideology, lifestyle, and physical appearance, along with numerous other aspects, and shifts in culture patterns can be seen to take root as a community becomes acculturated to Western customs and characteristics – in other words, Westernized. The phenomenon of Westernization does not follow any one specific pattern across societies as the degree of adaption and fusion with Western customs will occur at varying magnitudes within different communities. Specifically, the extent to which domination, destruction, resistance, survival, adaptation, or modification affect a native culture may differ following inter-ethnic contact.

== Western world ==
The West was originally defined as the Western world. A thousand years later, the East-West Schism separated the Catholic Church and Eastern Orthodox Church from each other. The definition of Western changed as the West was influenced by and spread to other nations. Islamic and Byzantine scholars added to the Western canon when their stores of Greek and Roman literature jump-started the Renaissance. The Cold War also reinterpreted the definition of the West by excluding the countries of the former Eastern Bloc. Today, most modern uses of the term refer to the societies in the West and their close genealogical, linguistic, and philosophical descendants. Typically included are those countries whose ethnic identity and dominant culture are derived from Western European culture. Though it shares a similar historical background, the Western world is not a monolithic bloc, as many cultural, linguistic, religious, political, and economic differences exist between Western countries and populations.

== Significantly influenced countries or regions ==
The following countries or regions experienced a significant influence by the process of Westernization:

- Azerbaijan.
- Hong Kong, Macau, and Singapore.
- Israel: Although Israel is geographically located in West Asia, many Western cultural influences were brought in Israel by Jewish settlers from the diaspora, particularly countries like Canada, France, Germany, the United Kingdom, and the United States. It is a member of the OECD. It is often a member of European organisations for sports and cultural events such as UEFA and Eurovision, which is due in large part to Israel's ouster from their respective Asian counterparts. According to Sammy Smooha, a professor emeritus of sociology at Haifa University, Israel is described as a "hybrid," a modern and developed "semi-Western" state. With time, he acknowledged, Israel will become "more and more Western." But as a result of the ongoing Arab–Israeli conflict, full Westernization will be a slow process in Israel.
- Japan, South Korea, and Taiwan.
- Americas.
- Philippines.
- Turkey.

== Views ==
=== Kishore Mahbubani ===
Kishore Mahbubani's book entitled The Great Convergence: Asia, the West, and the Logic of One World (Public Affairs), is very optimistic. It proposes that a new global civilization is being created. The majority of non-Western countries admire and adhere to Western living standards. It says this newly emerging global order has to be ruled through new policies and attitudes. He argues that policymakers all over the world must change their preconceptions and accept that we live in one world. The national interests must be balanced with global interests and the power must be shared. Mahbubani urges that only through these actions can we create a world that converges benignly.

Samuel P. Huntington posits a conflict between "the West and the Rest" and offers three forms of general action that non-Western civilizations can react toward Western countries.

1. Non-Western countries can attempt to achieve isolation to preserve their own values and protect themselves from Western invasion. He argues that the cost of this action is high and only a few states can pursue it.
2. According to the theory of "band-wagoning" non-Western countries can join and accept Western values.
3. Non-Western countries can make an effort to balance Western power through modernization. They can develop economic, and military power and cooperate with other non-Western countries against the West while still preserving their own values and institutions.

Mahbubani counters this argument in his other book, The New Asian Hemisphere: The Irresistible Shift of Global Power to the East. This time, he argues that Western influence is now "unraveling", with Eastern powers such as China arising. He states:

…the 5.6 billion people who live outside the West no longer believe in the innate or inherent superiority of Western civilization. Instead, many are beginning to question whether the West remains the most civilized part of the world. What we are witnessing today…is the progressive unwrapping of these many layers of Western influences.

He discusses the decline of Western influence and identifies factors contributing to the erosion of Western credibility in other parts of the world.

1. There is an increasing perception that Western countries will prioritize their domestic problems over international issues, despite their spoken and written promises of having global interests and needs.
2. The West has become increasingly biased and close-minded in their perception of "non-Western" countries such as China, declaring it an "un-free" country for not following a democratic form of government.
3. The West uses a double standard when dealing with international issues.
4. As the biggest Eastern populations gain more power, they are moving away from the Western influences they sought after in the past. The "anti-Americanism" sentiment is not temporary, as Westerners like to believe – the change in the Eastern mindset has become far too significant for it to change back.

=== Samuel P. Huntington ===
In contrast to territorial delineation, others, like the American political scientist Samuel P. Huntington in The Clash of Civilizations, consider what is "Western" based on religious affiliation, such as deeming the majority-Western Christian part of Europe and North America the West, and creating 6 other civilizations, including Latin America, Confucian, Japanese, Islamic, Hindu and Slavic-Orthodox, to organize the rest of the globe. Huntington argued that after the end of the Cold War, world politics had been moved into a new aspect in which non-Western civilizations were no more the exploited recipients of Western civilization but become another important actor joining the West to shape and move the world history. Huntington believed that while the age of ideology had ended, the world had only reverted to a normal state of affairs characterized by cultural conflict. In his thesis, he argued that the primary axis of conflict in the future will be along cultural and religious lines.

=== Edward Said ===
In Orientalism Edward Said views Westernization as it occurred in the process of colonization, an exercise of essentializing a "subject race" in order to more effectively dominate them. Said references Arthur Balfour, the British Prime Minister from 1902 to 1905, who regarded the rise of nationalism in Egypt in the late 19th century as counterproductive to a "benevolent" system of occupational rule. Balfour frames his argument in favor of continued rule over the Egyptian people by appealing to England's great "understanding" of Egypt's civilization and purporting that England's cultural strengths complemented and made them natural superiors to Egypt's racial deficiencies. Regarding this claim, Said says, "Knowledge to Balfour means surveying a civilization from its origins to its prime to its decline – and of course, it means being able to...The object of such knowledge is inherently vulnerable to scrutiny; this object is a 'fact' which, if it develops, changes, or otherwise transforms itself...[the civilization] nevertheless is fundamentally, even ontologically stable. To have such knowledge of such a thing is to dominate it." The act of claiming coherent knowledge of a society in effect objectifies and others it into marginalization, making people who are classified into that race as "almost everywhere nearly the same." Said also argues that this relationship to the "inferior" races, in fact, works to also fortify and make coherent what is meant by "the West"; if "The Oriental is irrational, depraved (fallen), childlike, "different..." then "...the European is rational, virtuous, mature, normal." Thus, "the West" acts as a construction in the similar way as does "the Orient" – it is a created notion to justify a particular set of power relations, in this case, the colonization and rule of a foreign country.

=== Chinese Communist Party ===
The Chinese Communist Party (CCP) rejects the view that modernization equals Westernization, instead touting its own development model. CCP general secretary Xi Jinping said that Chinese-style modernization "breaks the myth of 'modernization equals Westernization'". Zhang Zhanbin, an official at the CCP Central Party School wrote in the People's Daily that understanding the role of common prosperity is crucial to "clearly recognizing the major differences between Chinese-style modernization and the Western modernization path."

== Process ==
=== Colonization and Europeanization (1400s–1970s) ===
From the 1400s onward, Europeanization and colonialism spread gradually over much of the world and controlled different regions during this five centuries long period, colonizing or subjecting the majority of the globe.

Following World War II, Western leaders and academics sought to expand innate liberties and international equality. A period of decolonization began. At the end of the 1960s, most colonies were allowed autonomy. Those new states often adopted some aspects of Western politics such as a constitution, while frequently reacting against Western culture.

=== In the Americas and Oceania ===
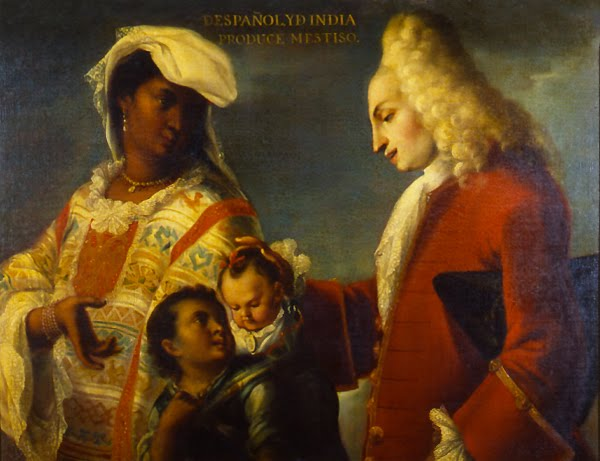
The racial mixing of Spaniards and Indigenous Latin Americans.

Due to the colonization of the Americas and Oceania by Europeans, the cultural, ethnic, and linguistic make-up of the Americas and Oceania has been changed. This is most visible in settler colonies such as: Australia and New Zealand in Oceania, and the United States, Canada, Argentina, Brazil, Chile, Costa Rica, and Uruguay in the Americas, where the traditional indigenous population has been predominantly replaced demographically by non-indigenous settlers due to transmitted disease and conflict. This demographic takeover in settler countries has often resulted in the linguistic, social, and cultural marginalisation of indigenous people. Even in countries where large populations of indigenous people remain or the indigenous peoples have mixed (mestizo) considerably with European settlers, such as countries in Latin America and the Caribbean: Mexico, Peru, Panama, Suriname, Ecuador, Bolivia, Venezuela, Belize, Paraguay, South Africa, Colombia, Guatemala, Haiti, Honduras, Guyana, El Salvador, Jamaica, Cuba, or Nicaragua, relative marginalisation still exists.

Latin America was shaped by Iberian culture, with local religious forms also mixing with Christian influences. In Mexico, indigenous people adopted writing alongside their traditional oral and pictorial forms of communication.

=== In Asia ===
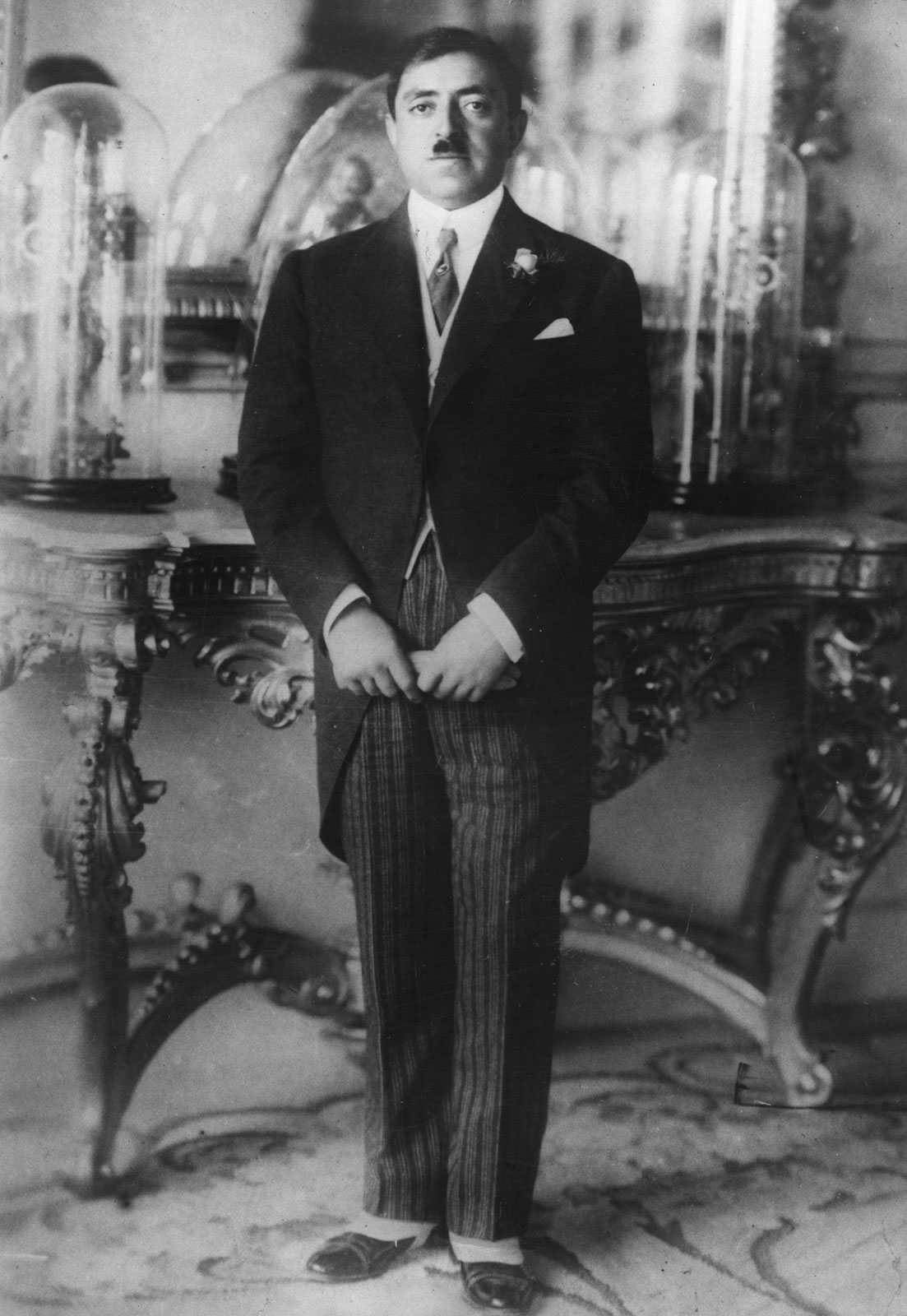
King Amanullah Khan of Afghanistan attempted to Westernize his country in the 1920s, but tribal revolts caused his abdication.

General reactions to Westernization can include fundamentalism, protectionism, or embrace to varying degrees. Countries such as Korea and China attempted to adopt a system of isolationism but have ultimately juxtaposed parts of Western culture into their own, often adding original and unique social influences, as exemplified by the introduction of over 1,300 locations of the traditionally Western fast-food chain McDonald's into China. Specific to Taiwan, the industry of bridal photography (see Photography in Taiwan) has been significantly influenced by the Western idea of "love". As examined by author Bonnie Adrian, Taiwanese bridal photos of today provide a striking contrast to past accepted norms, contemporary couples often displaying great physical affection and, at times, placed in typically Western settings to augment the modernity, in comparison to the historically prominent relationship, often stoic and distant, exhibited between bride and groom. Though Western concepts may have initially played a role in creating this cultural shift in Taiwan, the market and desire for bridal photography has not continued without adjustments and social modifications to this Western notion.

==== East Asia ====
===== China =====
The eastward spread of Western learning (simplified Chinese: 西学东渐; traditional Chinese: 西學東漸) refers to the spread of Western technologies and ideologies in China since the late Ming dynasty, which is contrast with the westward spread of Eastern learning (simplified Chinese: 东学西传; traditional Chinese: 東學西傳) that introduced Chinese technologies and ideologies to the West.

Total Westernization (Chinese: 全盘西化; pinyin: quánpán xīhuà) is a trend of intellectuals in Greater China, first proposed in 1915. Chen Xujing, Hu Shih, and others believed that the invasion of the late Qing dynasty by Western great powers was due to the backwardness of Chinese monarchical culture. Therefore, they advocate learning from Western ways of thinking and behavior, and completely abandoning China's authoritarian culture. Later, Hu Shih changed the concept of total westernization to "full globalization". Hu Qiuyuan believed that the failure of the war was the result of the wrong policies of the Ming and Qing governments and that the appeasement mentality of the traditionalists, the inferiority mentality of the Westernizers, and the dependence mentality of the Russians could all led to the downfall of the country. They should go beyond the three Open Door Policy, maintain an independent perspective, and find the ability of the Chinese nation to create culture. Ju Haoran believed that total Westernization should focus on the technical aspects based on modern Western science, emphasizing "total scientification" and industrialization.

===== Korea =====
In Korea, the first contact with Westernization was during the Joseon Dynasty, in the 17th century. Every year, the emperor dispatched a few envoy ambassadors to China and while they were staying in Beijing, the Western missionaries were there. Through the missionaries, Korean ambassadors were able to adopt Western technology. In the 19th century, Korea started to send ambassadors to the foreign countries, other than Japan and China. While Korea was being Westernized slowly in the late 19th century, Korea had the idea of "Eastern ways and Western frames (東道西器)", meaning that they accepted the Western "bowl", but used it with Eastern principles inside.

===== Japan =====
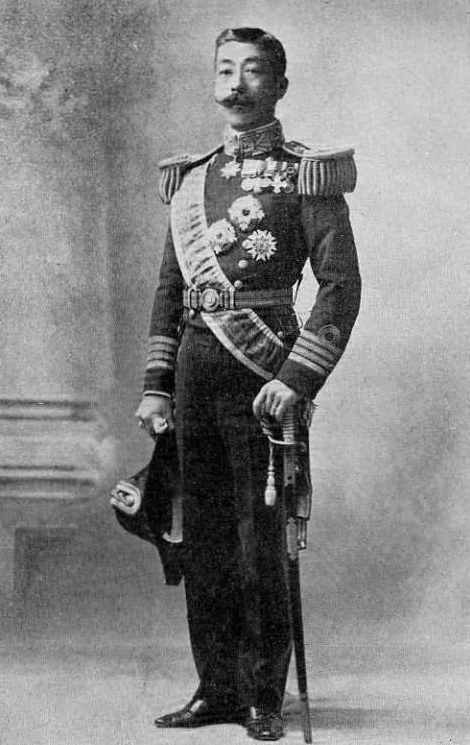
Another example of Westernization: Prince Yorihito Higashifushimi of Japan in typical Western naval dress uniform with white gloves, epaulettes, medals and hat.

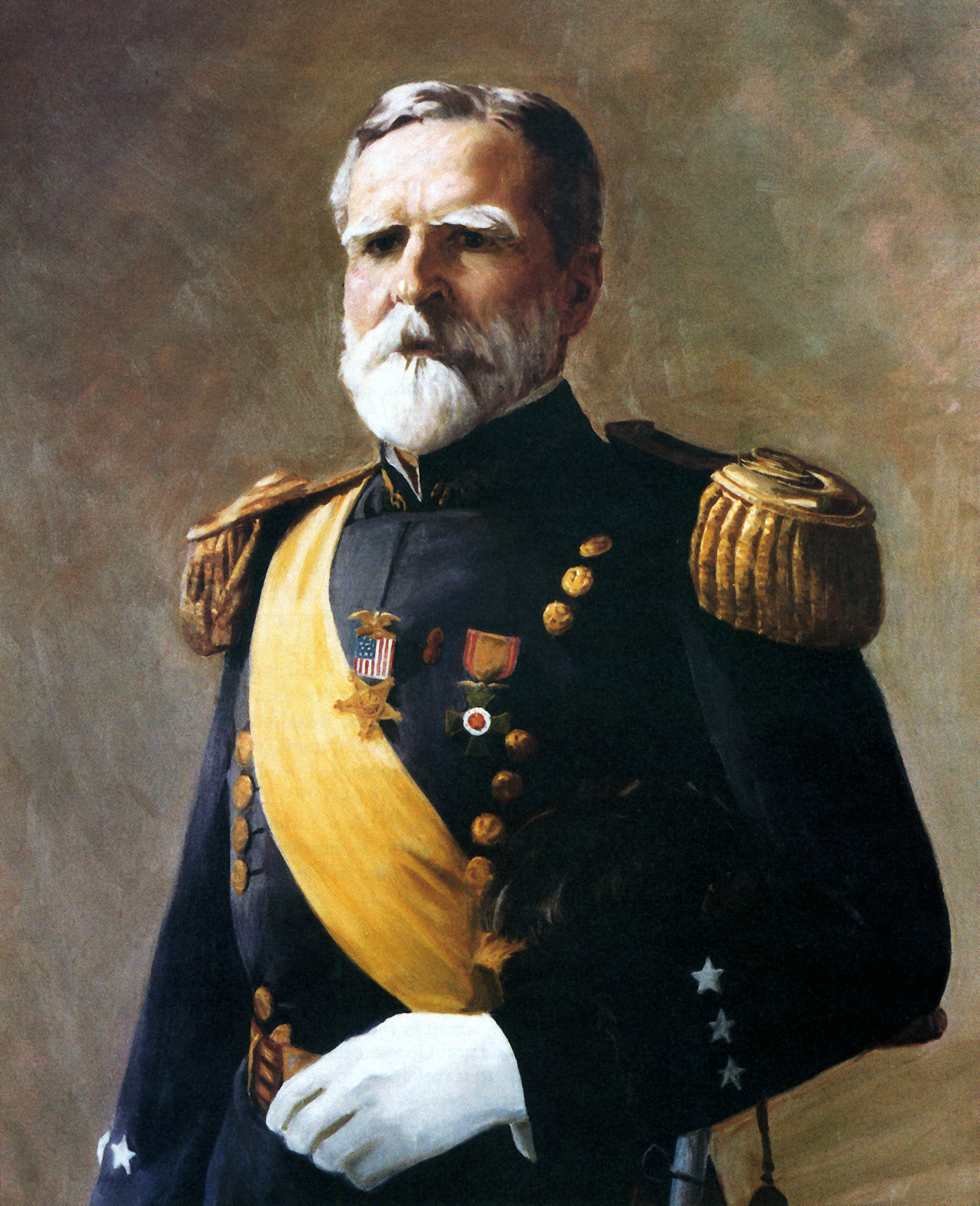
Similarity with U.S. General John C. Bates's uniform.

In Japan, the Netherlands continued to play a key role in transmitting Western know-how to the Japanese from the 17th century to the mid-19th century, because the Japanese had only opened their doors to Dutch merchants before US Navy commodore Matthew C. Perry's visit in 1853. After Commodore Perry's visit, Japan began to deliberately accept Western culture to the point of hiring Westerners to teach Western customs and traditions to the Japanese starting in the Meiji era. One of the key figures in the Westernization of Japan was Fukuzawa Yukichi, whose ten-volume book Seiyō Jijō (1866-1879) became the textbook for Japan's understanding of the West.

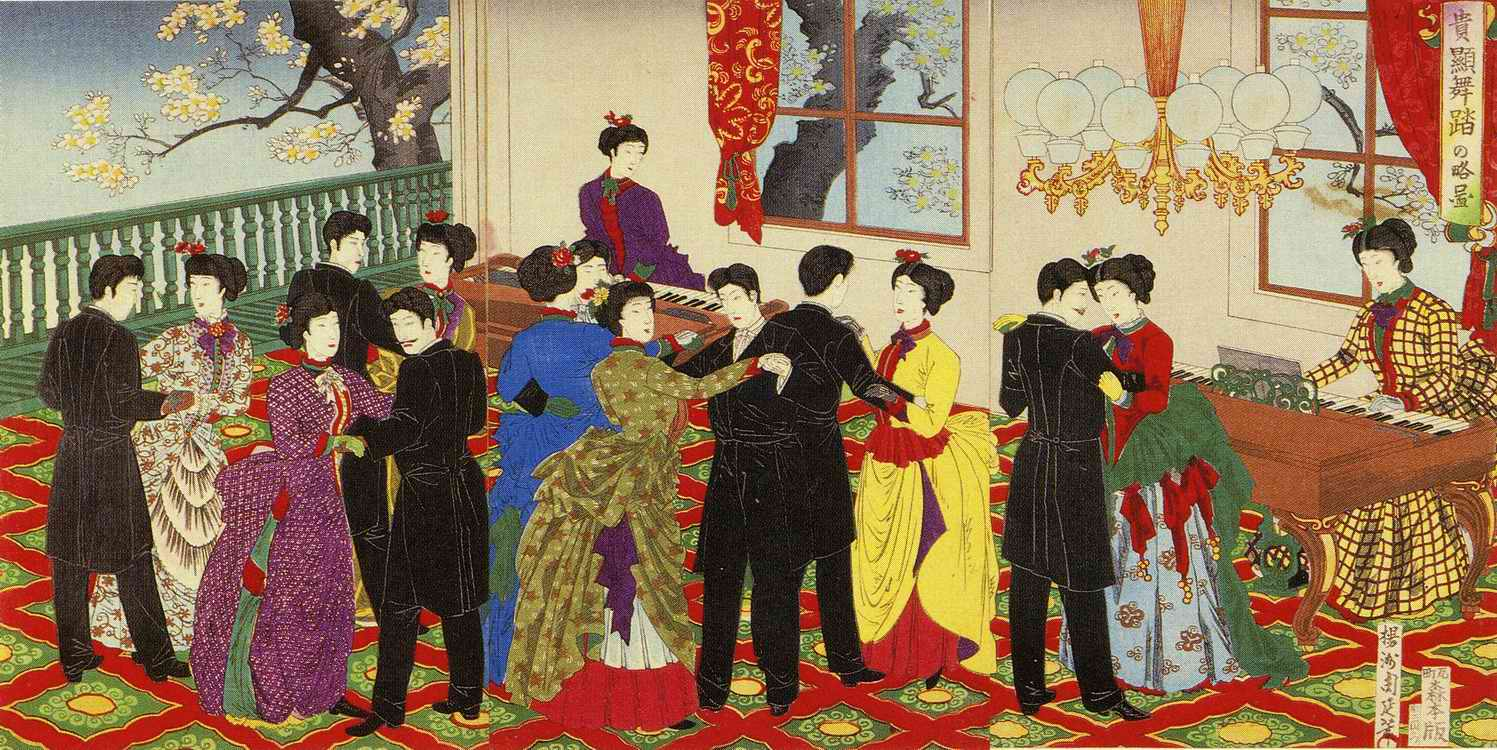
An example of 19th-century Westernization of Japanese society: ballroom dancing at the Rokumeikan, Tokyo, 1888

Since then, many Japanese politicians have encouraged the Westernization of Japan with the use of the term Datsu-A Ron, which means the argument for "leaving Asia" or "Good-bye Asia". In Datsu-A Ron, "Westernization" was described as an "unavoidable" but "fruitful" change. In contrast, despite many advances in industrial efficiency, Japan has sustained a culture of strict social hierarchy and limited individualization.

==== South Asia ====
===== India =====
At the turn of the 19th century, when India was being conquered by the East India Company, some of its native kingdoms sought Western education to learn how to deal with the threat. India's later independence movement also took inspiration from Western ideas about democracy and human rights. India's ruling class after independence in 1947 remained somewhat Westernized; India's first Prime Minister, Jawaharlal Nehru, had such a substantial Britishness that he once described himself as "the last Englishman to rule India." In 2014, however, the Bharatiya Janata Party (BJP) won power on the back of perceptions of the ruling class being insufficiently Indian.

==== Southeast Asia ====
===== Thailand =====
Although Thailand is geographically located in Southeast Asia, through the 18th and 19th centuries, Siam faced imperialist pressure from France and the United Kingdom, including many unequal treaties with Western powers and forced concessions of territory; it nevertheless remained the only Southeast Asian country to avoid direct Western colonization. The country became westernized by itself, the Siamese system of government was centralized and initially organized into a modern unitary absolute monarchy during the reign of Chulalongkorn, later as a constitutional monarchy following the Siamese revolution of 1932. In the late 1950s, Thailand became a major ally of the United States, and played a key anti-communist role in the region as a member of the SEATO. Currently, Thailand continues to have strong ties to Western countries.

===== Vietnam =====
Starting from the period of the Nguyễn dynasty as a protectorate of France, the Vietnamese transitioned from chữ Hán and chữ Nôm writing systems to the Vietnamese alphabet (chữ Quốc ngữ). Between the late 19th to early 20th centuries, a number of French style buildings were built in Saigon and Hanoi, becoming two of several locations in Asia claiming to be the Paris of the East. Vietnam is also a member of the International Organisation of La Francophonie. Under the Nguyễn dynasty, Christianity became established as a minority religion for currently around 7% of the population. After the abdication of Emperor Bảo Đại and the August Revolution that took place during the end of World War II, Vietnam would incorporate socialist and American values as it underwent industrialization and economic development during and after the period of political division.

==== West Asia ====
===== Iran =====
In Iran, the process of Westernization dates back to the country's attempt to westernize during the beginning of the 1930s, which was dictated by Shah Rezā Khan and continued by his son during the Cold War and agitated the largely conservative Shia Muslim masses of the country which was partly responsible for the 1979 Iranian Revolution.

===== Turkey =====
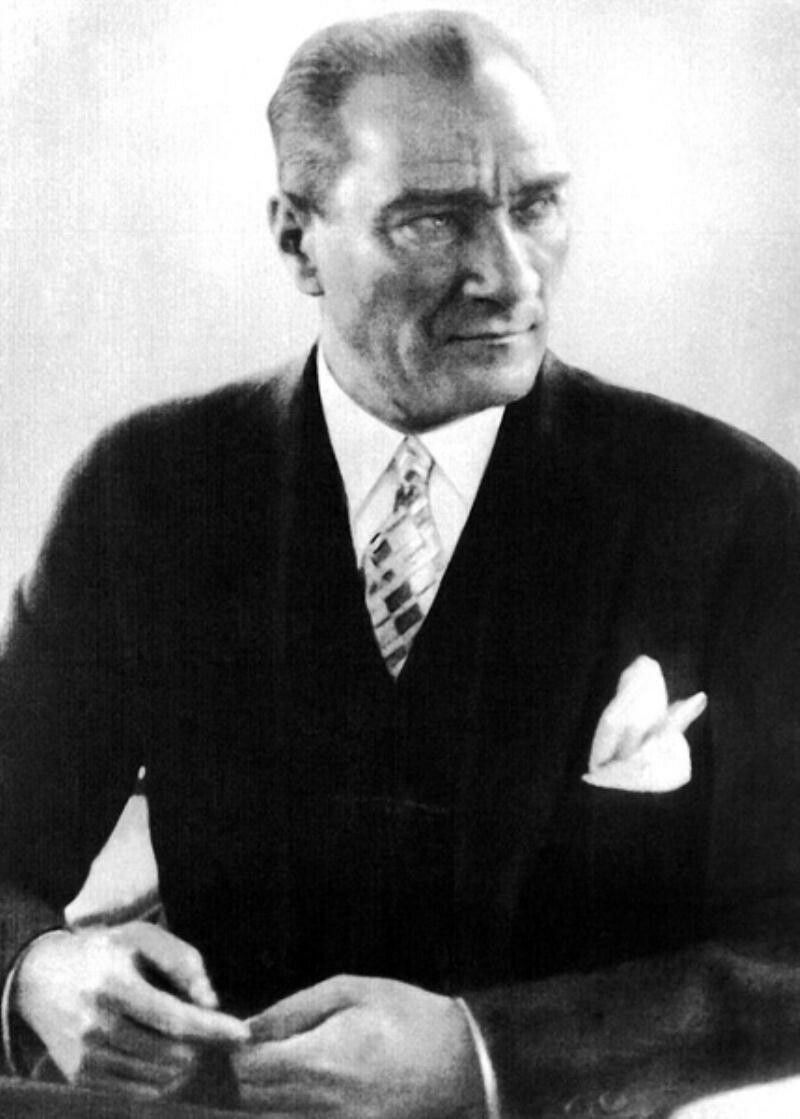
Mustafa Kemal Atatürk, founder of the Republic of Turkey.

In transcontinental Turkey, the synchronization process with the West is known as the Tanzimat (reorganization) period. The Ottoman Empire began to change itself according to modern science, practice, and culture. The Empire took some innovations from the West. Also, with the contribution of foreign engineers, the Empire repaired its old arm systems. Newly-found schools, permanent ambassadors, and privy councils were an essential improvement for the Empire. The Empire became a constitutional monarchy in 1876, but this was interrupted for 30 years in the aftermath of the disastrous Russo-Turkish War, whereupon Abdul Hamid II suspended the constitution and the parliament. Despite his autocratic rule, Abdul Hamid continued to sponsor educational reforms, which would ironically prove to be his downfall, as the Ottoman intelligentsia, discontent with his repression, coalesced into the Young Turk movement, who in 1908 successfully launched a revolution to restore the constitution, beginning a new period of political pluralism.

After the defeat of the Ottoman Empire in the First World War, Istanbul was occupied by the Entente Powers, and the Ottoman government was rendered a powerless puppet as the Allies prepared to carve up the Ottoman Empire. The Turkish National Movement, led by Mustafa Kemal Atatürk, assumed control over the country and initiated the Turkish War of Independence to drive the Allies out of Anatolia, and officially disbanded the Ottoman government in 1922. The Turks were victorious, and signed the Treaty of Lausanne in 1923, formally ending all hostilities with the Entente and securing the new Turkish government and its borders international recognition, leading to the creation of the Republic of Turkey.

The new Republican government of Atatürk launched a series of political, legal, religious, cultural, social, and economic reforms, great in both its scope and thoroughness. Turkey became a fully secular republic in 1928, and one of the first countries in the world to establish women's suffrage in 1930. A new Latin-script alphabet for Turkish was also adopted in 1928, being a precursor to other linguistic reforms aimed at purifying the Turkish language.

Turkey's historical interactions with Europe, together with the political and social reforms introduced under Mustafa Kemal Atatürk, contributed to the country's Westernization.

=== In Europe ===
==== Russia ====
Westernizers (/ˈzɑːpɑːdnɪk/; Russian: за́падник, romanized: západnik, IPA: [ˈzapədnʲɪk]) were a group of 19th-century intellectuals who believed that Russia's development depended upon the adoption of Western European technology and liberal government. In their view, Western ideas such as industrialisation needed to be implemented throughout Russia to make it a more successful country. The Russian term was зáпадничество (západnichestvo, "westernism"), and its adherents were known as the за́падники (západniki, "westernists").

In some contexts of Russian history, zapadnichestvo can be contrasted with Slavophilia, whose proponents argued that Russia should develop its own unique identity and culture, based on its Slavic heritage.

=== Globalization (1970s–present) ===
Westernization is often regarded as a part of the ongoing process of globalization. This theory proposes that Western thought has led to globalization, and that globalization propagates Western culture, leading to a cycle of Westernization. On top of largely Western government systems such as democracy and constitution, many Western technologies and customs like music, clothing, and cars have been introduced across various parts of the world and copied and created in traditionally non-Western countries.

Westernization has been reversed in some countries following war or regime change. For example: Russia in aftermath of the Russian Revolution in 1917 and Iran by the Iranian Revolution in 1979.

The main characteristics are economic and political (free trade) democratization, combined with the spread of an individualized culture. Often it was regarded as opposite to the worldwide influence of communism. After the break-up of the USSR in late 1991 and the end of the Cold War, many of its component states and allies nevertheless underwent Westernization, including privatization of hitherto state-controlled industry.

With debates still going on, the question of whether globalization can be characterized as Westernization can be seen in various aspects. Globalization is happening in various aspects, ranging from economics, politics, and even food or culture. Westernization, to some schools, is seen as a form of globalization that leads the world to be similar to Western powers. Being globalized means taking positive aspects of the world, but globalization also brings the debate about being Westernized. Democracy, fast food, and American pop culture can all be examples that are considered as Westernization of the world.

According to the "Theory of the Globe scrambled by Social network: a new Sphere of Influence 2.0", published by Jura Gentium (University of Florence), the increasing role of Westernization is characterized by social media. The comparison with Eastern societies, who decided to ban American social media platforms (such as Iran and China with Facebook and Twitter), marks a political desire to avoid the Westernization process of their own populations and ways to communicate.

== Consequences ==
=== Linguistic influence ===
Due to colonization and immigration, the formerly prevalent languages in the Americas, Oceania, and part of South Africa, are now usually Indo-European languages or creoles based on them:

- English (Australia, New Zealand, United States, and Canada (excluding Francophone regions of Canada); English along with English-based creole languages (Anglophone Africa, Antigua and Barbuda, Bahamas, Barbados, Dominica, Federated States of Micronesia, Fiji, Grenada, Guyana, Hong Kong, India, Jamaica, Kiribati, Marshall Islands, Nauru, Palau, Papua New Guinea, the Philippines, Saint Kitts and Nevis, Saint Lucia, Saint Vincent and the Grenadines, Samoa, Singapore, Solomon Islands, Sri Lanka, Tonga, Tuvalu, Trinidad and Tobago, and Vanuatu)
- French (Quebec, Maritime provinces, Manitoba, and Ontario in Canada. France's overseas collectivity Saint Pierre and Miquelon); French along with French-based creole languages (Francophone Africa, French Guiana, Guadeloupe, Haiti, Vanuatu, Martinique, and Saint-Barthelemy)
- Spanish (the Americas, Equatorial Guinea, Western Sahara, and the Philippines)
- Portuguese (Brazil, Lusophone Africa, East Timor, Macau, Goa, and other members of the Community of Portuguese Language Countries)
- Dutch along with Creole languages (Suriname, Aruba and the Netherlands Antilles)
- Afrikaans along with English (parts of South Africa and Namibia)
- German along with Creole languages (along with Afrikaans in Namibia and some areas in the US, such as Pennsylvania (Pennsylvania Dutch))

Many indigenous languages are on the verge of becoming extinct. Some settler countries have preserved indigenous languages; for example, in New Zealand, the Māori language is one of three official languages, the others being English (made an official language in 2026) and New Zealand sign language (official since 2006), another example is Ireland, where Irish is the first official language, followed by English as the second official language.

=== Sports importance in Westernization ===
The importance of sports partly comes from its connection to Westernization. The insight by Edelman, R., & Wilson, W. (2017) explains “This new system of thought and practices imbued with positive values in the exertion and strategic deployment of the human body, embracing the Anglo-American notion that physical activity was meaningful in and of itself, conducive to values such as learning and character-building. Modern athletics and competitive sports, avatars of this new body culture, elicited largely willing local receptions in North Asia, though there were no doubt isolated cases of coercive foisting better characterized as cultural imperialism.”

== See also ==
- Acculturation – Adjusting to a new cultural environment
- Anti-globalization – Worldwide political movement against multinational corporations
- Anti-Western sentiment – Hatred or opposition towards the Western world or its people
- Christianization – Conversion of society or culture to Christianity
- Colonialism – Control by distant groups
- Colonial mentality – Internalized attitude of ethnic or cultural inferiority
- Colonisation – Establishment and development of settlements by people or animals
- Cultural assimilation – Adoption of features of another culture
- Cultural diversity – Quality of diverse or different cultures
- Cultural imperialism – Cultural aspects of imperialism
- The Culture of Nakedness and the Nakedness of Culture – Study of Islamic and western views on clothing and culture
- Democratization – Society becoming more democratic
- East–West cultural debate – Historical Chinese debate on West vs East
- Global citizenship – Idea that all people have rights and responsibilities from being a member of the world
- Globalization – Increasing worldwide interdependence
- Indigenization – Form of cultural change
- McDonaldization – Sociological concept
- Melting pot – Monocultural metaphor
- Modern culture – Historical period and socio-cultural norm or attitude
- Modernization – Explanation for the process of modernization within societies
- Multiculturalism – Existence of multiple, distinct cultures within a single country
- Pop culture – Widespread norms in a society
- Post-Westernization – Conjectured era without Western dominance
- Western education – Education from the Western world
