= Mita Enzetsukai =

Japanese Cultural Society

The Mita Enzetsukai (Mita Oratory Association) was a Japanese society dedicated to the teaching of oratory techniques, Western rhetoric, and public speaking.

During the Meiji period, parliamentary reforms led to a more debate-centred form of politics in Japan. In response to the need to produce politicians skilled in oration, Yukichi Fukuzawa, the founder of Keio University, started the Mita Enzetsukai in 1873; it provided training in Japanese-language debate based on Western principles. At first, the society met at the homes of its members, but in 1875 Fukuzawa arranged construction of a permanent meeting hall, located on the grounds of Keio University. The building cost ¥2000 and had seating capacity of 400 (now approximately 140).
