= David Hale (economist) =

American economist and author (1951–2015)

- Born: David D Hale; 1951; Vermont, United States
- Died: 2015 (aged 63–64); Chicago, United States
- Occupation: Economist

David D. Hale (United States, November 22, 1951 – October 19, 2015) was an American economist and author. He was a member of the Council on Foreign Relations, and a recipient of the William F Butler Award from the National Association for Business Economics. Hale held a B.Sc. degree in international economic affairs from the Georgetown University School of Foreign Service and a M.Sc. degree in economic history from the London School of Economics.

== Personal life ==
David Hale was born in Vermont, USA. David graduated from St Johnsbury Academy in 1969 where he was in involved the science club and other extra curricula activities. He was married to Lyric Hughes Hale, an American entrepreneur who founded China Online. They had five children.

== Career ==
Hale is known for his work in macro-economic analysis and policy. He was a global economist for Kemper Financial Services, Zurich Financial Services and the Commonwealth Bank. He lectured at the World Economic Forum, the Fortune Global CEO Conference, and the National Association of Governors. Hale testified before U.S. congressional committees on domestic and international economic policy issues, advised the US Department of Defense, and conducted briefings for senior officials in the executive branch, including former President George W. Bush.

== Media ==
Hale was a contributor to The Wall Street Journal, the Financial Times, The New York Times, the Nihon Keizai Shimbun, the Australian Financial Review, Harvard Business Review, Foreign Affairs, Foreign Policy, National Interest and Central Banking. He was also a regular guest on radio and television programs, in Europe, Asia, Australia and the United States

== Memberships and awards ==
Hale is a member of the National Association for Business Economics, New York Society of Security Analysts, National Business Economics Issue Council, Academic Advisory Board of the Federal Reserve Bank of Chicago, and Competitive Markets Advisory Council of the Chicago Mercantile Exchange. He is a member of the Council on Foreign Relations in New York and Chicago, and member of the Australian American Leadership Dialogue. In September 1990, the New York chapter of the National Association of Business Economists conferred upon Hale, the William F. Butler Award, for making 'an outstanding contribution to the field'. Other recipients have included Paul Volcker, Geoffrey Moore, Lawrence Klein, Alan Greenspan, and Otto Eckstein.

== Publications ==
- What's Next: Unconventional Wisdom on the Future of the World Economy. David Hale and Lyric Hughes Hale. 2011. Yale University Press. ISBN 9780300170313.
