= Fukuzawa Yukichi =

Japanese writer and philosopher (1835–1901)

Fukuzawa Yukichi 福澤諭吉
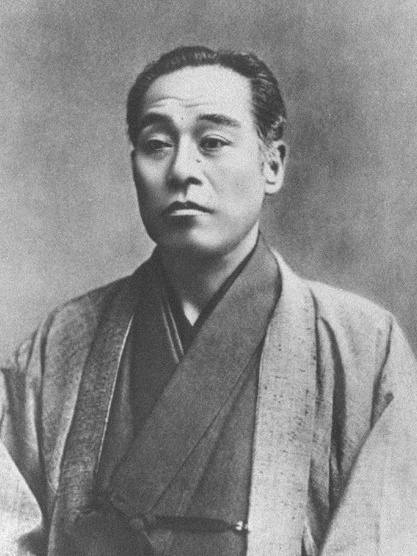
- Fukuzawa in 1891
- Born: 10 January 1835; Osaka, Kawachi Province, Japan
- Died: 3 February 1901 (aged 66); Tokyo, Japan
- Education: Tekijuku
- Known for: Founder of Keio University; Founder of Jiji Shinpō
- Spouse: Toki Okin (m. 1861)
- Children: 9

Fukuzawa Yukichi (Japanese: 福澤 諭吉; 10 January 1835 – 3 February 1901) was a Japanese writer, educator, and philosopher who is regarded as one of the key figures of the Meiji era for his efforts to introduce and promote Western ideas and institutions in Japan. He was the founder of Keio Gijuku (the foundation of the modern Keio University) and the newspaper Jiji Shinpō.

Born into a low-ranking samurai family, Fukuzawa became critical of the feudal class system of Tokugawa Japan. He studied Dutch (Rangaku) and later taught himself English, eventually becoming an official translator for the shogunate. He traveled abroad with the first Japanese mission to the United States in 1860 and the first mission to Europe in 1862. These experiences convinced him that Japan needed to adopt not only Western technology but also its social, economic, and political institutions to achieve national strength and equality.

After the Meiji Restoration of 1868, Fukuzawa became a leading promoter of the Bunmei-kaika (Civilization and Enlightenment) movement. He declined all government positions, choosing to remain an independent educator and writer. His prolific writings, including the bestsellers Seiyō Jijō (Conditions in the West) and Gakumon no Susume (An Encouragement of Learning), explained Western civilization and advocated for social change. In Gakumon no Susume, he famously wrote, "Heaven never created a man above another nor a man below another," arguing that social status was determined by education and practical knowledge (jitsugaku).

Fukuzawa's views on foreign policy evolved from idealism to a pragmatic acceptance of Social Darwinism, arguing that military strength was essential for national survival. In his influential 1885 editorial "Datsu-A Ron" ("Leaving Asia"), he advocated for Japan to align itself with the "civilized" nations of the West and distance itself from its "hopelessly backward" Asian neighbors. He became a strong supporter of the First Sino-Japanese War. Fukuzawa's legacy is immense but complex; he is revered for his foundational contributions to Japan's modernization, education, and the promotion of individual liberty, while his later embrace of nationalism and imperialism remains a subject of debate. His portrait appeared on the 10,000 yen note from 1984 to 2024.

== Early life and education ==
=== Birth in Osaka and return to Nakatsu ===
Fukuzawa Yukichi was born on 10 January 1835 in Osaka, Japan, into a low-ranking but respected samurai family of the Okudaira clan of Nakatsu. His father, Fukuzawa Hyakusuke, held the rank of nakakosho with a low stipend of a little over thirteen koku of rice, and served as the domain's overseer of the treasury in Osaka. The family's position, though clerical, provided some material comforts beyond their small official stipend. Fukuzawa was the youngest of five children, with one older brother and three older sisters.

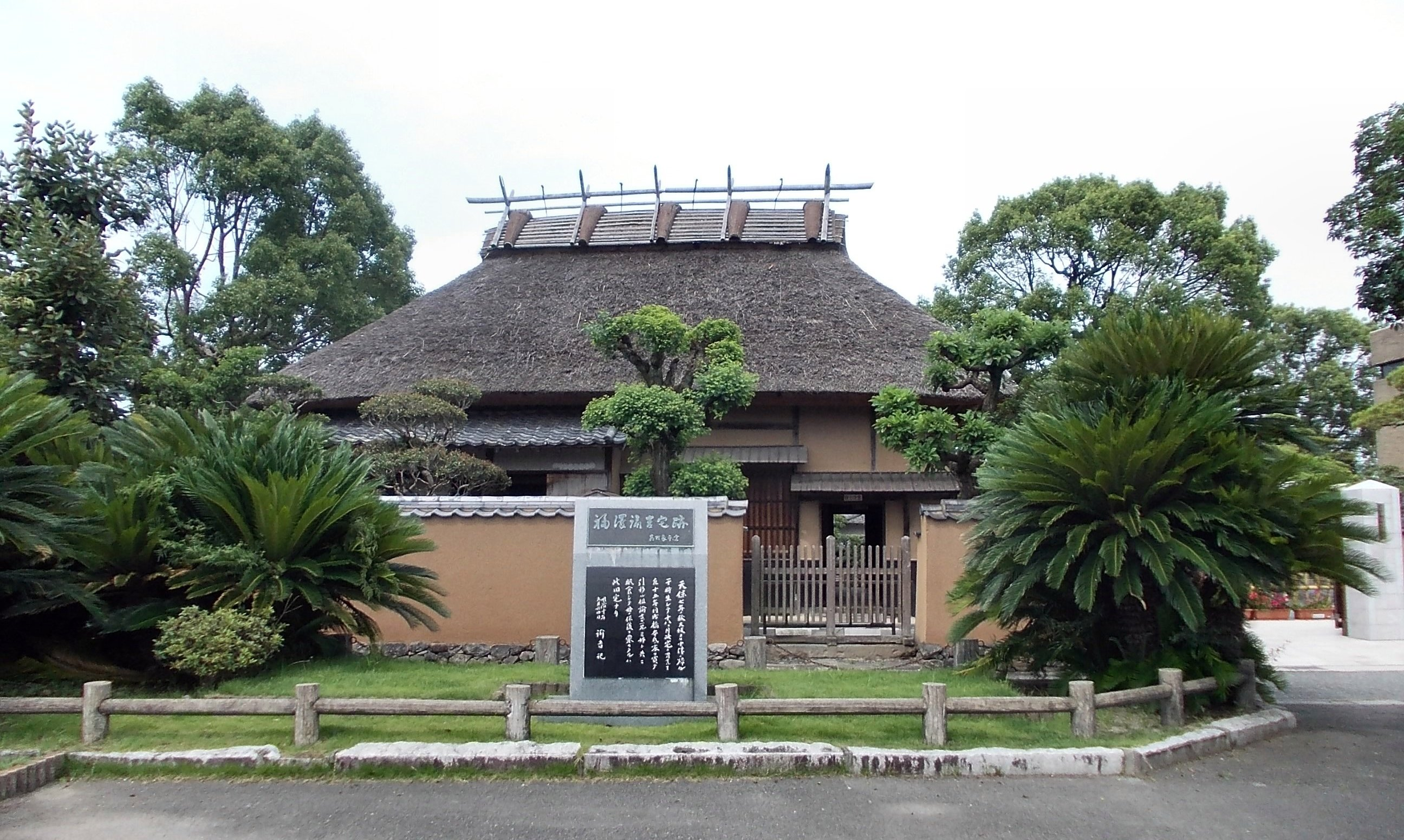
Fukuzawa's childhood home in Nakatsu, Ōita Prefecture

His father was a Confucian scholar who opposed his children learning practical skills like mathematics, considering them the "tool of merchants" and demeaning to their samurai status. Hyakusuke died in 1836, forcing the family to return to their home castle town of Nakatsu in Kyushu. The move was difficult for Fukuzawa's mother, O-Jun, who had grown accustomed to city life. The family faced a significant reduction in income, living on their small official stipend. As the younger son, Fukuzawa had no prospect of inheriting the headship of the family and its associated stipend, which would go to his older brother. His options were limited to being adopted into another family, becoming a priest, or remaining at home and supporting himself through odd jobs.

=== Life in a feudal society ===
Nakatsu was a small, provincial castle town governed by the Okudaira clan, loyal vassals of the ruling Tokugawa shogunate. Society was rigidly stratified by law. The samurai class was at the top, followed by peasants, artisans, and merchants. Within the samurai class, strict feudal discipline reinforced the lower samurai’s inferiority to the upper. A lower samurai had to use honorific language, speak with a different accent, and in some cases, prostrate himself on the ground when in the presence of an upper samurai. The Fukuzawa family was of lower samurai status, living in a district far from the central castle, a physical indicator of their social standing. Advancement beyond one's inherited rank was nearly impossible; as Fukuzawa later wrote, there was as much chance of promotion as a "four-legged beast [might] hope to fly like a bird." This rigid class system instilled in Fukuzawa a lifelong resentment of the feudal system, which he declared he hated "as though it were my father’s murderer."

Poverty forced many low-ranking samurai families, including the Fukuzawas, to engage in side jobs to survive, such as making sandals or umbrellas, despite the official disdain for commercial activities. Education was also stratified; upper samurai studied Confucian classics and military strategy, while lower samurai were primarily instructed in practical skills like writing and arithmetic. Fukuzawa did not begin his formal education until the age of fourteen, but he quickly excelled, leading discussions and debates on Chinese philosophy. Encouraged by his liberal-minded mother, he developed a desire to leave the "narrow stiffness" of Nakatsu.

=== Western studies ===
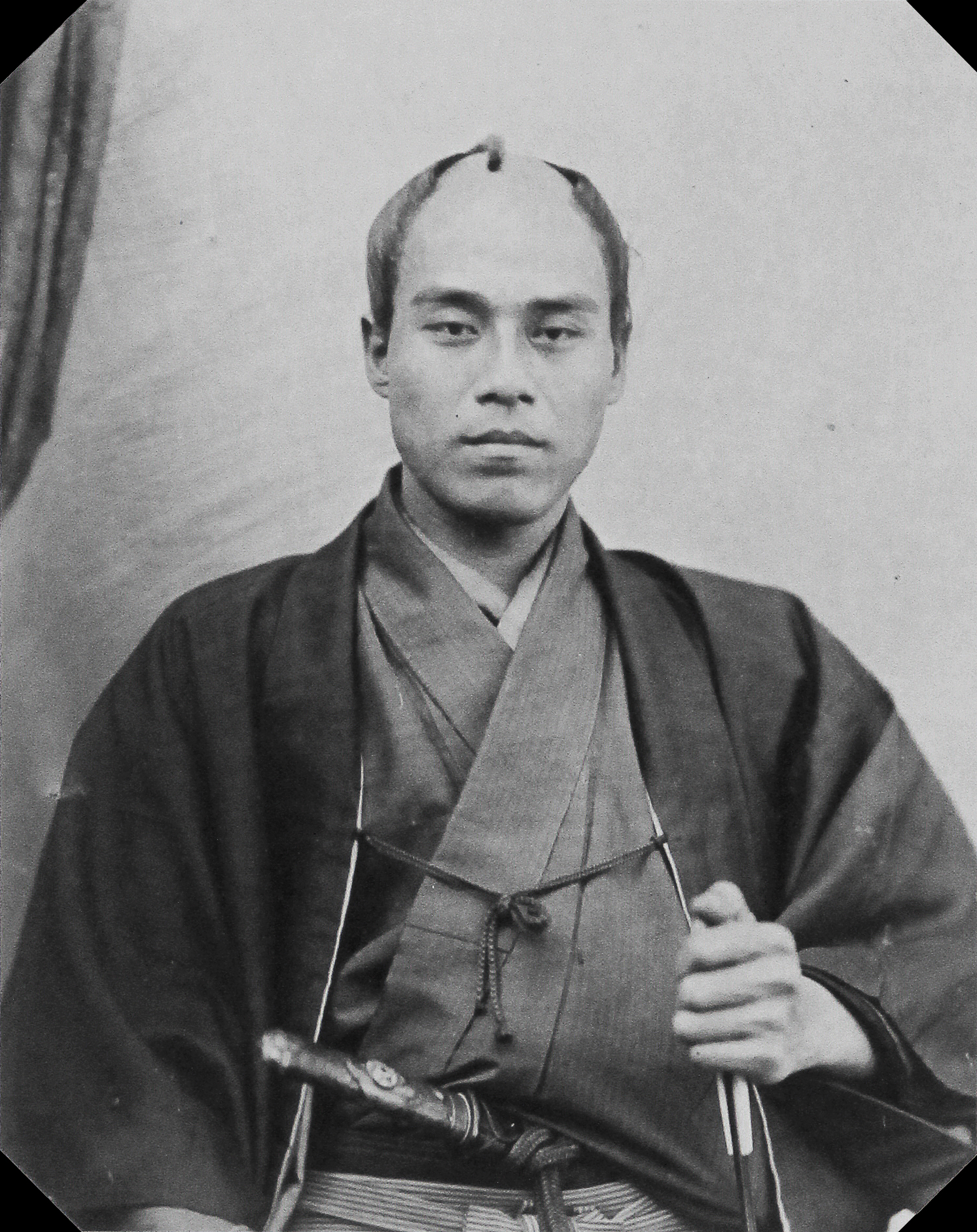
Fukuzawa in 1862

In February 1854, at the age of nineteen, Fukuzawa left Nakatsu for Nagasaki, one of the few places in secluded Japan with contact with the West. He traveled there to study Dutch (Rangaku), then the primary language for Western learning, and the technical operation of modern weaponry. This was shortly after Commodore Matthew C. Perry's "Black Ships" had arrived in Edo Bay, signaling the end of Japan's long isolation. In Nagasaki, Fukuzawa lived in the home of a bakufu official and quickly progressed in his language studies. However, his success aroused the jealousy of his patron, who concocted a false story that Fukuzawa's mother was ill to force him to return home.

Seeing through the ruse, Fukuzawa decided not to return to Nakatsu but instead to travel to Edo. On his journey, he stopped in Osaka in March 1855, where his brother Sannosuke was now the domain's storehouse manager. Sannosuke persuaded him to stay and continue his Dutch studies at the renowned Tekijuku, a school run by the physician and scholar Ogata Kōan. The students at Tekijuku worked with fanatical zeal, studying physics, chemistry, and medicine from the few Dutch books available.

Fukuzawa's studies were interrupted in 1856 by the death of his brother, which forced him to return to Nakatsu to become the head of the Fukuzawa family. He detested the boring life of a lower-level samurai and, after three months, received permission from the domain lord to return to Tekijuku. He became a boarder at the school, where he excelled, eventually becoming the head student. During this time, he developed a disdain for Chinese studies, which he saw as impractical, and fully embraced Western learning.

== Travels abroad and early career ==
=== Move to Edo and first mission to America ===
In 1858, the Nakatsu domain ordered Fukuzawa to move to Edo (modern Tokyo) to establish a Dutch studies school for the domain's vassals. Shortly after arriving, he visited the new treaty port of Yokohama and was shocked to discover that most Westerners there spoke English, not Dutch. His years of Dutch study were suddenly obsolete. He immediately began to teach himself English.

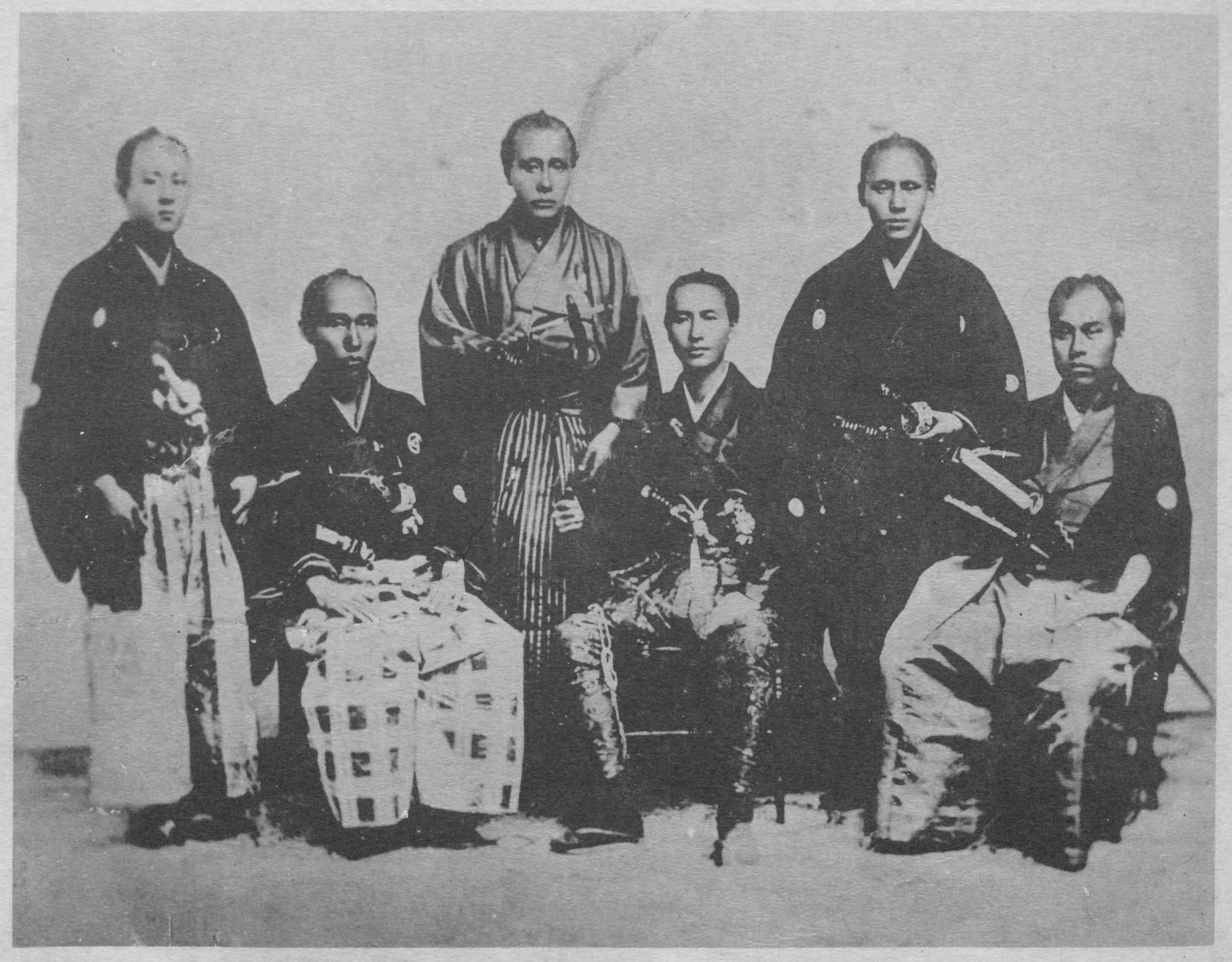
Sailors of the Kanrin Maru, members of the Japanese Embassy to the United States in 1860. Fukuzawa is seated on the far-right.

In 1860, as part of the Treaty of Amity and Commerce, the Tokugawa shogunate sent its first diplomatic mission to the United States. While the main delegation traveled on an American warship, a second ship, the Kanrin Maru, was purchased from the Dutch to serve as an escort, crewed entirely by Japanese sailors. Determined to be part of this historic voyage, Fukuzawa volunteered his services and was accepted as the personal steward to the ship's captain, Kimura Yoshitake. The Kanrin Maru reached San Francisco after a harrowing journey. While most of his fellow travelers were disoriented by the foreign culture, Fukuzawa sought to learn as much as possible. He was not surprised by Western technology, which he understood from his studies, but was struck by social and cultural differences, such as the apparent wastefulness of American society and customs like ladies and gentlemen dancing together at parties.

=== Mission to Europe ===
Upon his return to Japan in June 1860, Fukuzawa was hired by the bakufu as a translator of diplomatic documents. The period was one of intense anti-foreign sentiment, and those associated with Western learning risked their lives. Fukuzawa remained cautious but determined to continue his work. In 1861, he married Toki Okin, the daughter of an upper-ranking Nakatsu samurai.

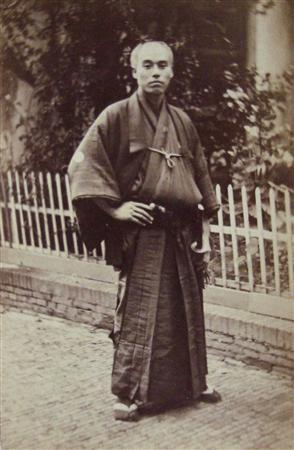
Fukuzawa posing in Utrecht as part of the First Japanese Embassy to Europe in 1862

In 1862, Fukuzawa joined another shogunal mission, this time to Europe, as an official translator. The goal was to negotiate a delay in the opening of further ports to foreign trade. The mission traveled through France, Britain, the Netherlands, Prussia, Russia, and Portugal over the course of a year. In London, the group visited the 1862 International Exhibition, Woolwich Arsenal, and the Houses of Parliament. Fukuzawa was an indefatigable note-taker, inquiring about hospitals, banks, the postal system, and the party system. This journey solidified his belief that Japan needed to adopt not just Western science but also its social and political institutions to achieve equality and strength. He began writing his famous work Conditions in the West in 1864, with the first volume published in 1866.

== Meiji Restoration and enlightenment ==
=== Sidestepping the civil war ===
Fukuzawa returned to Japan in 1863 to a country in turmoil. The struggle between the weakening Tokugawa shogunate and pro-imperial forces was escalating into civil war. As a translator for the bakufu, Fukuzawa was a fierce partisan of the Tokugawa cause until shortly before its overthrow in 1868. He saw the shogunate's government as "bureaucratic, oppressive, [and] conservative," but considered the imperial forces "still more anti-foreign and violent in their action." He believed both sides were ignorant of the need for fundamental reform.

While fighting raged in Edo in 1868, Fukuzawa remained focused on his educational work. At the very time the city was in chaos, he purchased a large estate in the Mita district of Edo and moved his small school there. He renamed it Keio Gijuku after the Keio era name, and it became the foundation for the modern Keio University. He continued lecturing on Francis Wayland's Elements of Political Economy during the Battle of Ueno, a testament to his belief in the primacy of education and enlightenment even in times of political upheaval.

=== Champion of "Civilization and Enlightenment" ===
With the establishment of the new Meiji government in 1868, Fukuzawa was repeatedly offered government positions but declined them all, choosing to remain an independent private citizen. He became a leading voice of the Bunmei-kaika (Civilization and Enlightenment) movement. His understanding of the concepts of "civilization" and "enlightenment" was first shaped by American geography textbooks by Samuel Mitchell and Sarah Cornell, which outlined a theory of societal development through stages such as "savage," "barbarous," and "civilized."

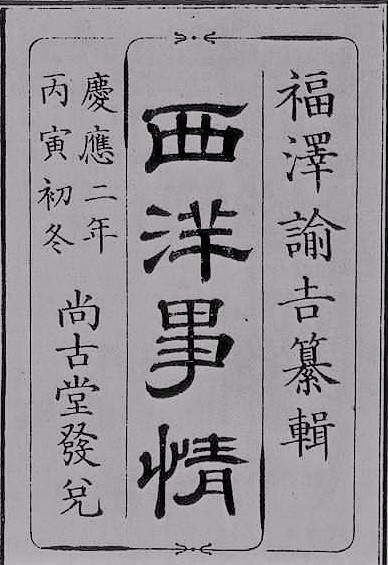
Cover page of the first volume of Seiyō Jijō, 1867

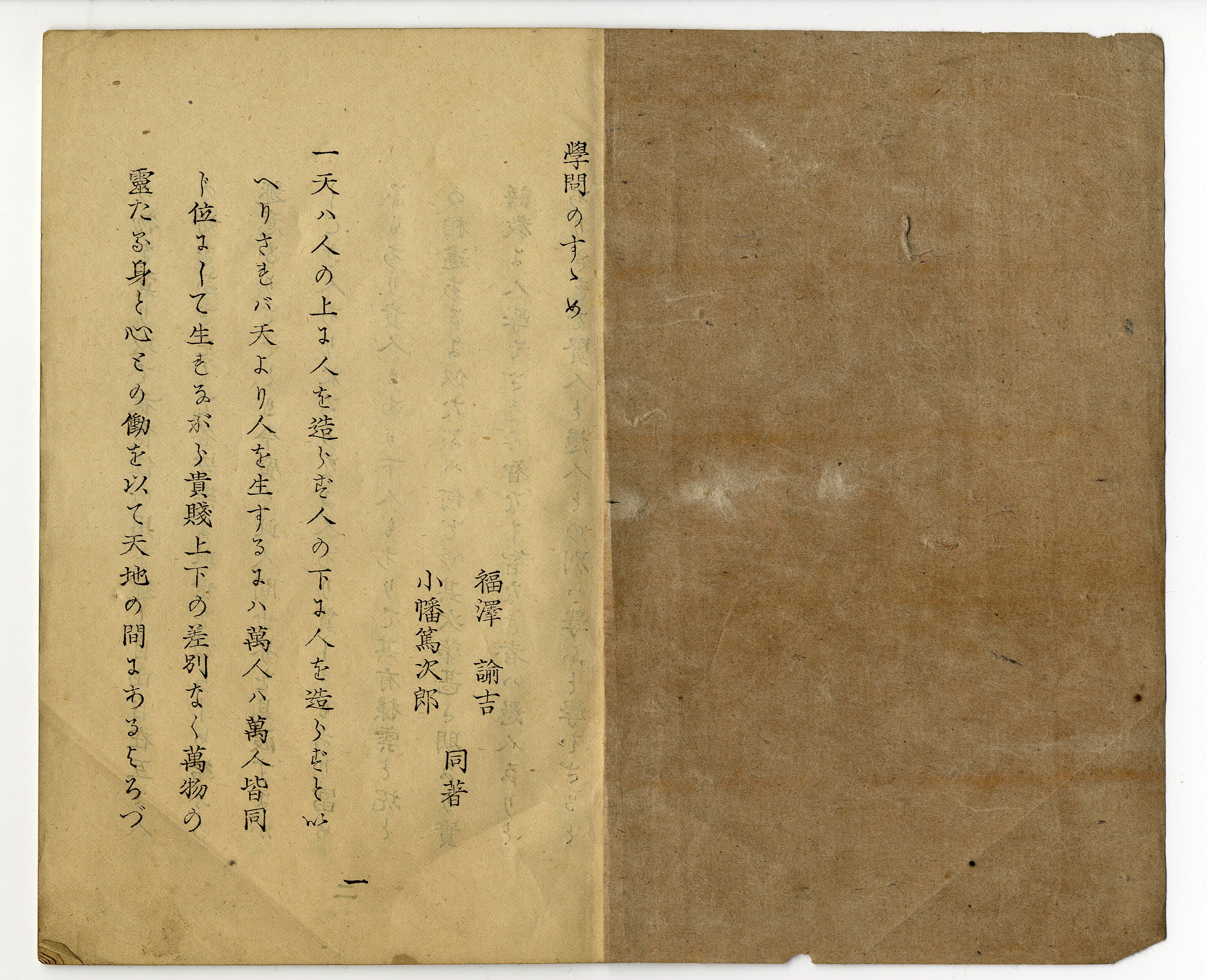
First page of Gakumon no Susume (An Encouragement of Learning, 1872), written by Fukuzawa and Obata Tokujirō

His first major work after the Restoration was Seiyō Jijō (Conditions in the West), published in installments from 1867 to 1879, which described Western political, economic, and social institutions in simple terms. It became an immediate bestseller, selling around 250,000 copies. Even more influential was his series of pamphlets, Gakumon no Susume (An Encouragement of Learning), published between 1872 and 1876. Its opening line, "Heaven never created a man above another nor a man below another," became a frequently quoted phrase when advocating for social equality in the new era. In the work, Fukuzawa argued that differences in social status were not inherent but arose from differences in education. He advocated for practical, scientific learning (jitsugaku) over traditional Confucian scholarship. The book sold millions of copies and was instrumental in shaping the Meiji government's 1872 Fundamental Code of Education.

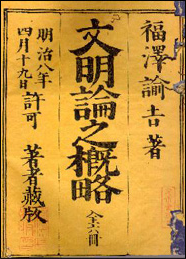
Cover page of Bunmeiron no Gairyaku (An Outline of a Theory of Civilization, 1875)

In 1875, he published Bunmeiron no Gairyaku (An Outline of a Theory of Civilization), a more scholarly work that analyzed the stages of civilization and applied them to Japan's history. Drawing on the work of European historians like François Guizot, Fukuzawa argued that Western civilization was characterized by a "balance" of diverse elements, whereas Japan's development had been "unbalanced" by the dominance of political power. He was also a founding member of the Meirokusha, an intellectual society established in 1874 to promote enlightenment ideas through its journal, the Meiroku zasshi.

== Views and ideas ==
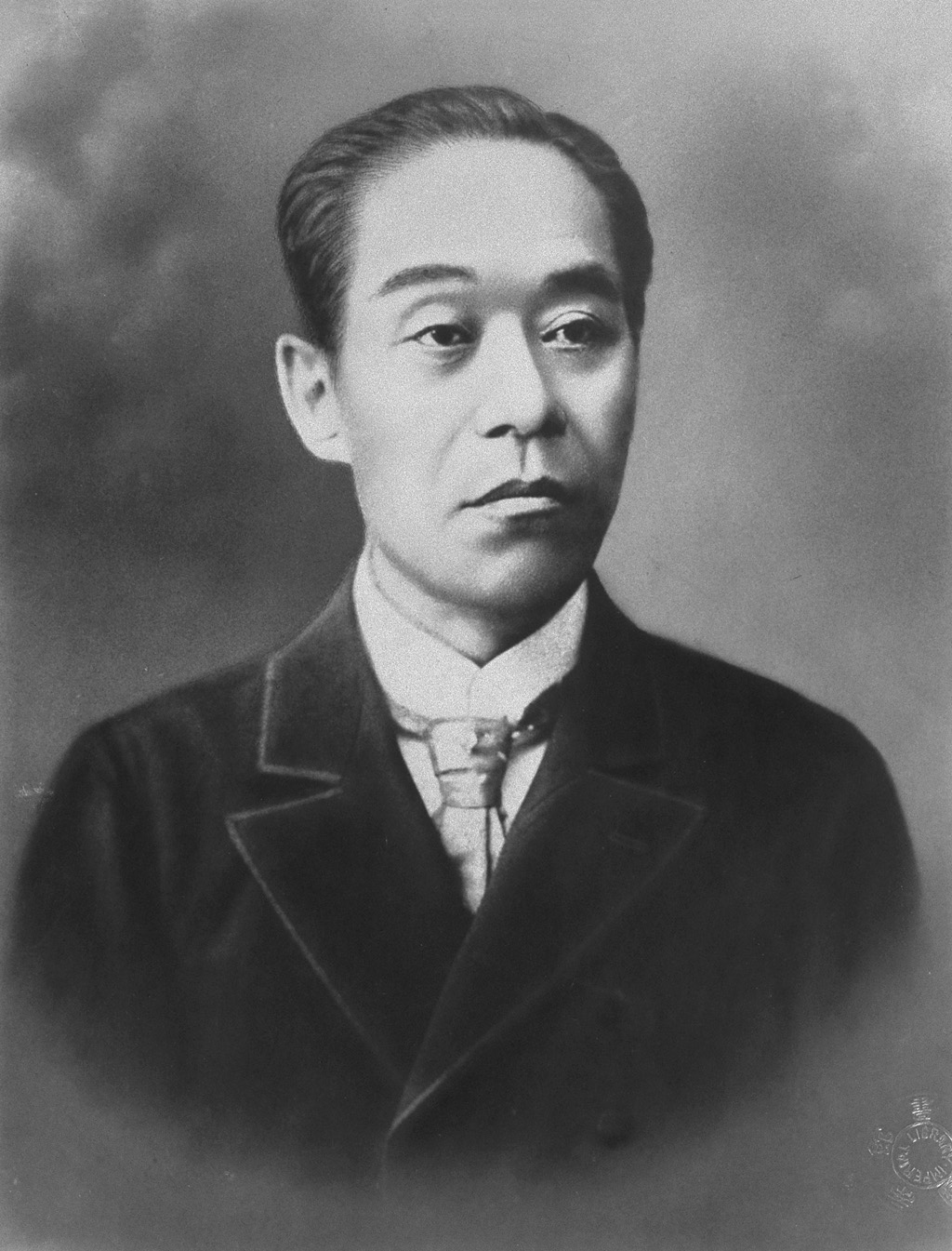
Portrait of Fukuzawa

=== Government and popular rights ===
Fukuzawa was a staunch advocate for a representative government modeled on the British Parliament. He argued that the relationship between government and the people was a contractual one, where the government's sole function was to protect the people's rights—to life, property, and honor—in exchange for taxes. He criticized the traditional Confucian model, which granted rulers unlimited power over their subjects, a concept he termed "preponderance of power."

His relationship with the Freedom and Popular Rights Movement of the 1870s and 1880s was complex. While the movement's leaders drew heavily on his writings, Fukuzawa himself became critical of their methods, which he saw as disruptive and muddleheaded. He believed that political change should come about through gradual enlightenment and discussion among the educated elite. He was a key behind-the-scenes advocate for the establishment of a National Diet, writing an influential series of articles in 1879 that helped galvanize public opinion and led to the emperor's promise in 1881 to establish a constitution.

=== Views on women ===
Fukuzawa was one of the Meiji-era advocates for women's rights. He condemned traditional practices such as concubinage, which he viewed as barbaric, and argued for monogamous marriage based on equality between husband and wife. He believed that women should receive an education, not just in domestic arts but also in economics and practical sciences, to ensure their independence. He argued that the unequal status of women within the family was a major impediment to Japan's national progress.

However, Fukuzawa's views had limitations. His advocacy for equality was largely confined to the husband-wife relationship within the family. He did not support political rights for women or careers outside the home. There was also a notable contradiction between his public pronouncements and his private life. While his sons received an elite Western-style education, his five daughters received a traditional, home-based education, with their upbringing left entirely to their conservative mother. They were not permitted to express opinions, go out alone, or speak to guests, and were married off in their late teens. His primary goal for them was a stable and prosperous marriage, reflecting the conventional values of the time.

=== Foreign relations and "Leaving Asia" ===
Fukuzawa's views on foreign policy evolved significantly. An initial faith in a universal "rational principle" governing international relations gave way to a pragmatic acceptance of power politics. Influenced by Social Darwinism, he came to believe that "might is right" and that military strength was essential for national survival. He argued that "a few cannons are worth more than a hundred volumes of international law."

This shift began earlier than is often thought. In the final chapter of his 1875 work An Outline of a Theory of Civilization, Fukuzawa argued that in the current international environment, Japan's national independence had to take precedence over the pursuit of civilization as an abstract ideal. He saw Japan's neighbors, Qing China and Joseon Korea, as hopelessly backward and stagnant, incapable of modernizing to resist Western encroachment. In his famous 1885 editorial "Datsu-A Ron" ("Leaving Asia"), he argued that Japan should mentally and politically distance itself from its "bad friends" in Asia and align itself with the civilized nations of the West. He became a fervent supporter of the First Sino-Japanese War (1894–95), which he considered a war for civilization against barbarism. Through his influential newspaper, Jiji Shinpō, which he founded in 1882, he promoted a jingoistic nationalism that helped rally public support for the war and for Japan's subsequent imperial expansion.

== Later life and legacy ==
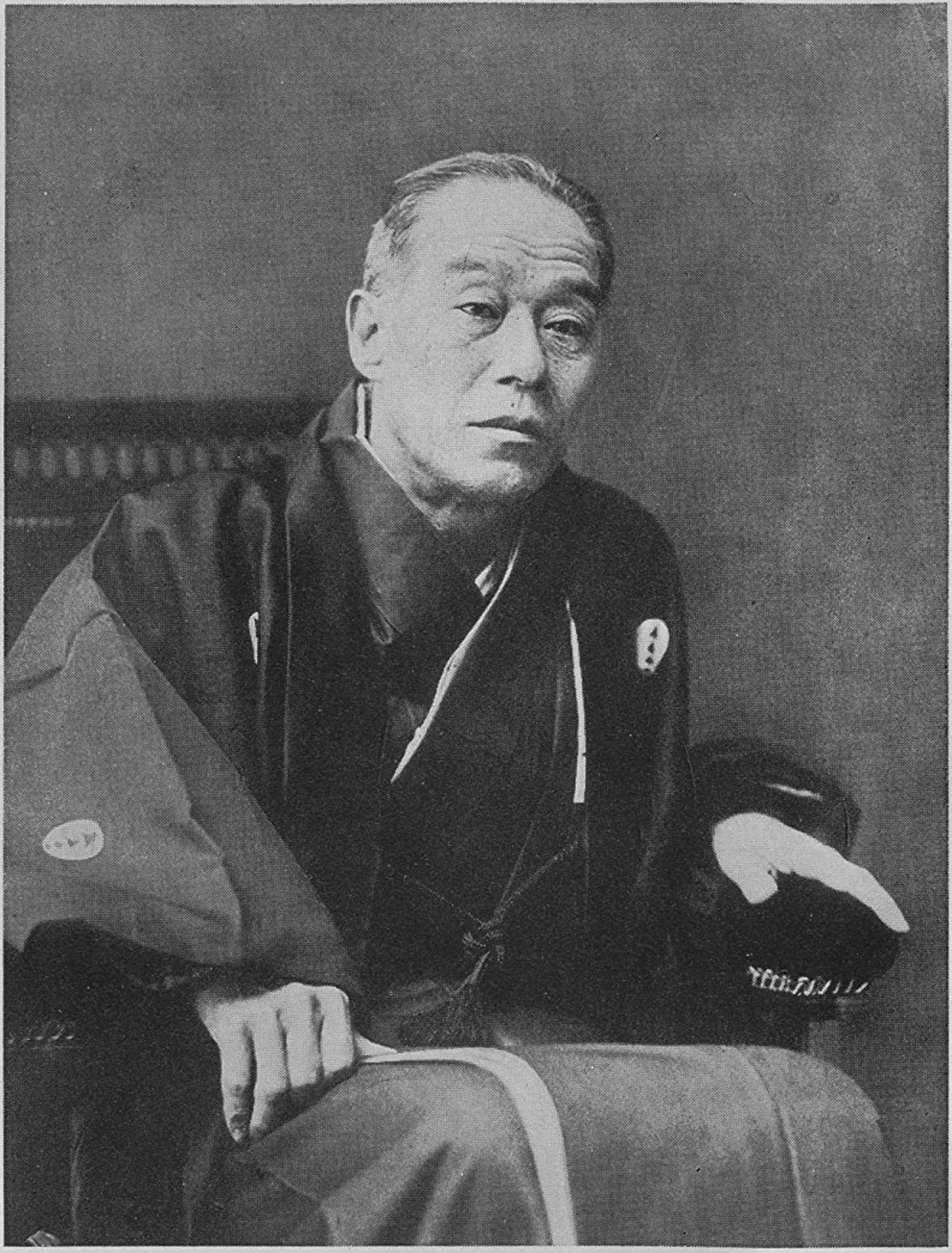
Fukuzawa in 1901

By the 1890s, Fukuzawa was an influential figure in Japan, though he held no official title. His school, Keio, was producing graduates who would become leaders in business, finance, and journalism. His newspaper, Jiji Shinpō, was a major voice in national affairs. He had also become a successful entrepreneur and a kingmaker in the business world through his network of Keio alumni.

Fukuzawa suffered his first stroke in September 1898, which left him partially disabled. It was after this event that he dictated his autobiography, Fukuō Jiden (The Autobiography of Old Fukuzawa), which remains a classic of Japanese literature and a key historical document. He suffered a second stroke on 25 January 1901, and died on 3 February. His funeral was a major public event, attended by thousands, and the Lower House of the Diet passed an unprecedented resolution recognizing his profound contributions to the nation.

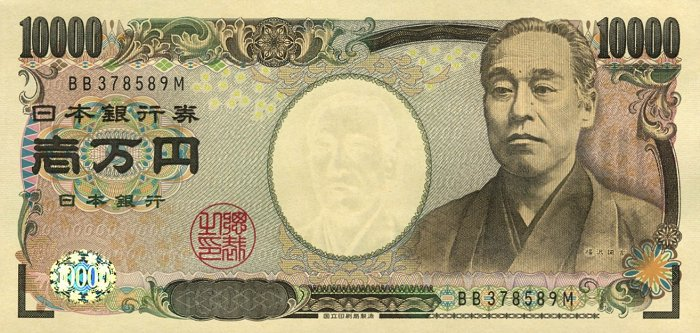
Fukuzawa appeared on the 10,000-yen banknote from 1984 to 2024.

Fukuzawa's legacy is immense and multifaceted. Keio University remains one of Japan's most prestigious private universities. His ideas on education, independence, and practical learning fundamentally shaped the modernization of Japan. He is regarded as a thinker who dealt with complex Western ideas more extensively than most of his contemporaries, logically extending Enlightenment thought to analyze Japan's situation and plot its future. At the same time, his legacy is complicated by his later embrace of nationalism and imperialism, which provided an intellectual foundation for Japan's expansionist policies in the 20th century. In 1984, in recognition of his central role in the nation's development, his portrait was placed on the 10,000 yen note, the highest denomination of Japanese currency.

Fukuzawa's childhood home in the Rusui-cho neighbourhood of the city of Nakatsu in Ōita Prefecture still exists. It is located on the lower reaches of the Nakatsu River, almost due east of Nakatsu Castle (33°36′26″N 131°11′27″E). Fukuzawa was born in 1835 in the Nakatsu Domain warehouse in Osaka and the family returned to Nakatsu after his father's death when he was 18 months old. He lived in this house in Nakatsu until age 19. The structure is a typical samurai residence of the late Edo Period and is a one-story wooden, thatch roof building with two 6-tatami, one 8-tatami, and one 4.5 tatami rooms. The north of the main building is a two-story kura storehouse with a tile roof. In 1971 this former residence and the ruins of a former residence across the street were designated as a National Historic Site. The house and the adjacent Fukuzawa Yukichi Memorial Hall, which displays the original manuscript of Gakaku no Susume and Fukuzawa Yukichi's personal belongings, are the major tourist attractions of this city. It is located approximately a 15-minute walk from Nakatsu Station on the JR Kyushu Nippō Main Line.

== Bibliography ==
=== Original Japanese books ===
1. English-Japanese dictionary (増訂華英通語 Zōtei Kaei Tsūgo, 1860)
2. Things western (西洋事情 Seiyō Jijō, 1866, 1868 and 1870)
3. Rifle instruction book (雷銃操法 Raijyū Sōhō, 1867)
4. Guide to travel in the western world (西洋旅案内 Seiyō Tabiannai, 1867)
5. Records of the eleven treaty countries (条約十一国記 Jyōyaku Jyūichi-kokki, 1867)
6. Western clothes, food, and housing (西洋衣食住 Seiyō Isyokujyū, 1867)
7. Handbook for soldiers (兵士懐中便覧 Heishi Kaicyū Binran, 1868)
8. Illustrated book of physical sciences (訓蒙窮理図解 Kinmō Kyūri Zukai, 1868)
9. Outline of the western art of war (洋兵明鑑 Yōhei Meikan, 1869)
10. Pocket almanac of the world (掌中万国一覧 Shōcyū Bankoku-Ichiran, 1869)
11. English parliament (英国議事院談 Eikoku Gijiindan, 1869)
12. Sino-British diplomatic relations (清英交際始末 Shin-ei Kosai-shimatsu, 1869)
13. All the countries of the world, for children written in verse (世界国尽 Sekai Kunizukushi, 1869)
14. Daily lesson for children (ひびのおしえ Hibi no Oshie, 1871) - These books were written for Fukuzawa's first son Ichitarō and second son Sutejirō.
15. Book of reading and penmanship for children (啓蒙手習の文 Keimō Tenarai-no-Fumi, 1871)
16. Encouragement of learning (学問のすゝめ Gakumon no Susume, 1872–1876)
17. Junior book of ethics with many tales from western lands (童蒙教草 Dōmō Oshie-Gusa, 1872)
18. Deformed girl (かたわ娘 Katawa Musume, 1872)
19. Explanation of the new calendar (改暦弁 Kaireki-Ben, 1873)
20. Bookkeeping (帳合之法 Chōai-no-Hō, 1873)
21. Maps of Japan for children (日本地図草紙 Nihon Chizu Sōshi, 1873)
22. Elementary reader for children (文字之教 Moji-no-Oshie, 1873)
23. How to hold a conference (会議弁 Kaigi-Ben, 1874)
24. An Outline of a Theory of Civilization (文明論之概略 Bunmeiron no Gairyaku, 1875)
25. Independence of the scholar's mind (学者安心論 Gakusya Anshinron, 1876)
26. On the separation of powers (分権論 Bunkenron, 1877)
27. Popular economics (民間経済録 Minkan Keizairoku, 1877)
28. Collected essays of Fukuzawa (福澤文集 Fukuzawa Bunsyū, 1878)
29. On currency (通貨論 Tsūkaron, 1878)
30. Popular discourse on people's rights (通俗民権論 Tsūzoku Minkenron, 1878)
31. Popular discourse on national rights (通俗国権論 Tsūzoku Kokkenron, 1878)
32. Transition of people's way of thinking (民情一新 Minjyō Isshin, 1879)
33. On the National Diet (国会論 Kokkairon, 1879)
34. Commentary on the current problems (時事小言 Jiji Shōgen, 1881)
35. On general trends of the times (時事大勢論 Jiji Taiseiron, 1882)
36. On the imperial household (帝室論 Teishitsuron, 1882)
37. On armament (兵論 Heiron, 1882)
38. On moral training (徳育如何 Tokuiku-Ikan, 1882)
39. On the independence of learning (学問之独立 Gakumon-no Dokuritsu, 1883)
40. On the national conscription (全国徴兵論 Zenkoku Cyōheiron, 1884)
41. Popular discourse on foreign diplomacy (通俗外交論 Tsūzoku Gaikōron, 1884)
42. On Japanese womanhood (日本婦人論 Nihon Fujinron, 1885)
43. On gentlemen's moral life (士人処世論 Shijin Syoseiron, 1885)
44. On moral conduct (品行論 Hinkōron, 1885)
45. On association of men and women (男女交際論 Nannyo Kosairon, 1886)
46. On Japanese manhood (日本男子論 Nihon Nanshiron, 1888)
47. On reverence for the Emperor (尊王論 Sonnōron, 1888)
48. Future of the Diet; Origin of the difficulty in the Diet; Word on the public security; On land tax (国会の前途 Kokkai-no Zento; Kokkai Nankyoku-no Yurai; Chian-Syōgen; Chisoron, 1892)
49. On business (実業論 Jitsugyōron, 1893)
50. One hundred discourses of Fukuzawa (福翁百話 Fukuō Hyakuwa, 1897)
51. Foreword to the collected works of Fukuzawa (福澤全集緒言 Fukuzawa Zensyū Cyogen, 1897)
52. Fukuzawa sensei's talk on the worldly life (福澤先生浮世談 Fukuzawa Sensei Ukiyodan, 1898)
53. Discourses of study for success (修業立志編 Syūgyō Rittishihen, 1898)
54. Autobiography of Fukuzawa Yukichi (福翁自伝 Fukuō Jiden, 1899)
55. Reproof of "the essential learning for women"; New essential learning for women (女大学評論 Onnadaigaku Hyōron; 新女大学 Shin-Onnadaigaku, 1899)
56. More discourses of Fukuzawa (福翁百余話 Fukuō Hyakuyowa, 1901)
57. Commentary on the national problems of 1877; Spirit of manly defiance (明治十年丁丑公論 Meiji Jyūnen Teicyū Kōron; 瘠我慢の説 Yasegaman-no Setsu, 1901)

=== English translations ===
- The Autobiography of Fukuzawa Yukichi, Revised translation by Eiichi Kiyooka, with a foreword by Carmen Blacker, NY: Columbia University Press, 1980 [1966], ISBN 978-0-231-08373-7
- The Autobiography of Fukuzawa Yukichi, Revised translation by Eiichi Kiyooka, with a foreword by Albert M. Craig, NY: Columbia University Press, 2007, ISBN 978-0-231-13987-8
- The Thought of Fukuzawa series, (Paperback) Keio University Press
  - vol.1 福澤諭吉 (2008), An Outline of a Theory of Civilization, Translation by David A. Dilworth, G. Cameron Hurst, III, Keio University Press, ISBN 978-4-7664-1560-5
  - vol.2 福澤諭吉 (2012), An Encouragement of Learning, Translation by David A. Dilworth, Keio University Press, ISBN 978-4-7664-1684-8
  - vol.3 福澤諭吉 (2017), Fukuzawa Yukichi on Women and the Family, Edited and with New and Revised Translations by Helen Ballhatchet, Keio University Press, ISBN 978-4-7664-2414-0
  - Vol.4 The Autobiography of Fukuzawa Yukichi. Revised translation and with an introduction by Helen Ballhatchet.

== See also ==
- Jiji Shinpō
- Keio-Gijuku University
- List of motifs on banknotes
- Mita Enzetsukai
- Nakae Chōmin
- Natsume Sōseki
- Susumu Nishibe
- Tsuneari Fukuda
- Yamamoto Tsunetomo
- Yukio Mishima
- Zenpuku-ji
