= Seiyō Jijō =

1866–1879 series by Fukuzawa Yukichi

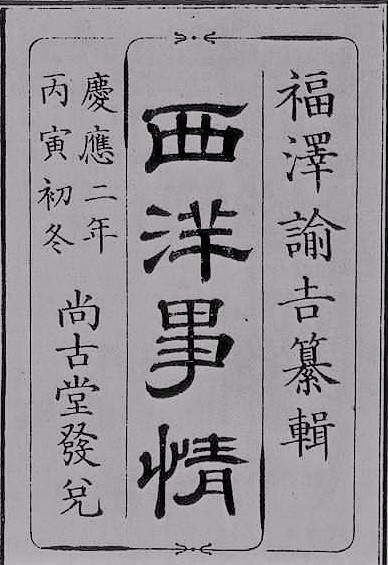
Cover page of Seiyō Jijō

Seiyō Jijō (Japanese: 西洋事情, lit. 'Things Western'), also known as Conditions of the West, is a ten-volume book by Fukuzawa Yukichi. It was the textbook for Japan's understanding of the West prior to the Meiji Restoration. Fukuzawa wrote it after his role as part of the first diplomatic mission to the United States. Fukuzawa was known as a strong advocate for Japan's embrace of international relations after the end of the closed-border sakoku period. The volumes were published in installments from 1866 to 1879. The book gave Fukuzawa his status as the foremost expert on Western civilization in Japan.

== Contents ==
The book consists of Fukuzawa's explanations of Western concepts and assorted translated extracts from Western texts.

Volume 1 contains 23 sections: politics, taxation, national bonds, paper money, merchant companies, foreign relations, military structure, literature and technology, schools, newspapers, hospitals, libraries, museums, exhibitions, hospitals, poorhouses, mute homes, blind homes, lepers, and idiot asylums, steam engines, steamships, steam cars, telegraphs, and gas lamps.

Volumes 2 and 3 cover the history, politics, military and finances of the United States, the Netherlands and Great Britain. Later volumes include translations of the economics work of Samuel A. Chambers and Francis Wayland, followed by translations of William Blackstone's Commentaries on the Laws of England, Wayland's theories on taxations, and the governments of Russia and France.
