= Hiroshige III =

Japanese artist

Utagawa Hiroshige III (三代目 歌川 広重, Sandaime Utagawa Hiroshige; 1842 or 1843 – March 28, 1894) was a Japanese ukiyo-e artist who was a student of Utagawa Hiroshige. He was also referred to as Andō Tokubei (安藤徳兵).

Born Gotō Torakichi (後藤寅吉), he was given the artistic name Shigemasa. In 1867, after Hiroshige II, a fellow pupil of the original Hiroshige, divorced the master's daughter Otatsu, Gotō married her and initially took on the name Hiroshige II as well, but by 1869 he began calling himself Hiroshige III.

Hiroshige III worked in the same artistic style as his master, but did not achieve anywhere near the same level of success.

== Later career ==
Although his aesthetic already falls within a certain mannerism, and his works appear minor when compared with the great masters of the 18th century, Hiroshige III's prints are notable for their depictions of the new port city of Yokohama and of Tokyo's flourishing Western-style buildings and steam locomotives, as in the 1871 triptych Tokyo Takanawa Kaigan Jōki Kisha Tetsudō no Zu and the series Tokyo Meisho no Uchi (1879) and Tōkai Meisho Kaisei Gojūsan Eki (1876), the latter also depicting foreigners in an exoticised manner. He dedicated at least nine prints to Tokyo's Shimbashi and Yokohama stations, showing a steam train arriving, departing or waiting, to commemorate the 1872 opening of the Tokyo–Yokohama railway line. His series Dai Nippon Bussan Zue, comprising 118 chūban-format prints published by Ōkura Magobei in August 1877, was significant for coinciding with the opening of the Naikoku Kangyō Hakurankai, Japan's first National Industrial Exhibition, held in Ueno Park, Tokyo. He also produced the series Ryūsai Manga (Ryūsai being one of his own art names), published by Mizuno Keijirō in 1879, in which he arranged three, four or even five sketches on a single sheet in the harimaze-e format, again drawing on a tradition associated with his master Hiroshige I, who is credited with inventing the harimaze genre. Hiroshige III died on 28 March 1894. Although not regarded today as a major artist, he was a popular one in his time, ranked among the top five ukiyo-e artists, alongside Kunichika, Gekkō, Yoshitoshi and Kobayashi Kiyochika, in the 1880 list Kōkoku Shoga Meika Ichiran. His pupil Shōsai Ikkei was active from around 1860 until the late 1870s.<ref name="MiloneUkiyoe2022p306">

== Gallery ==
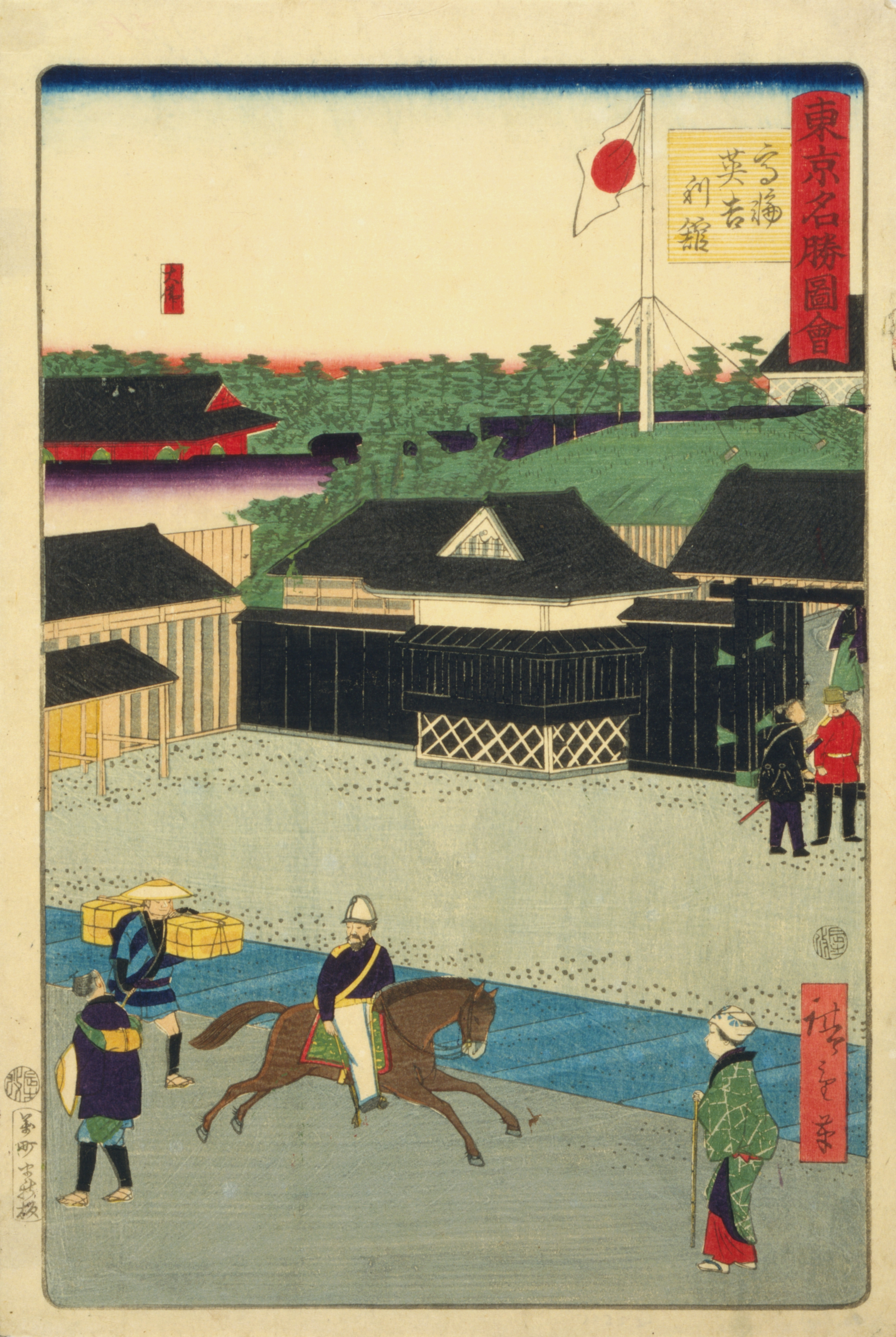
British house in Takanawa, 1868

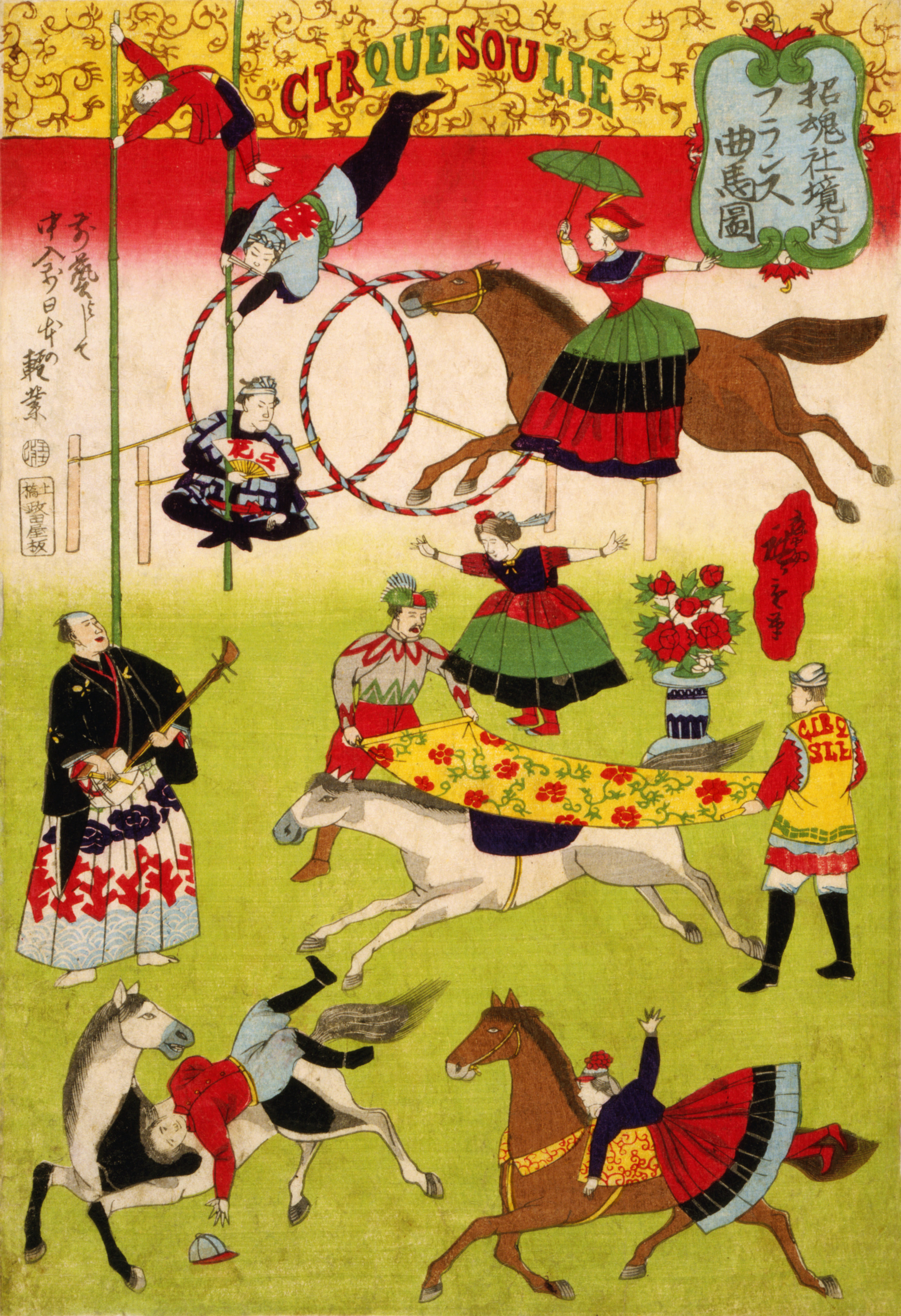
Big French circus on the grounds of Shokonsha shrine, 1871

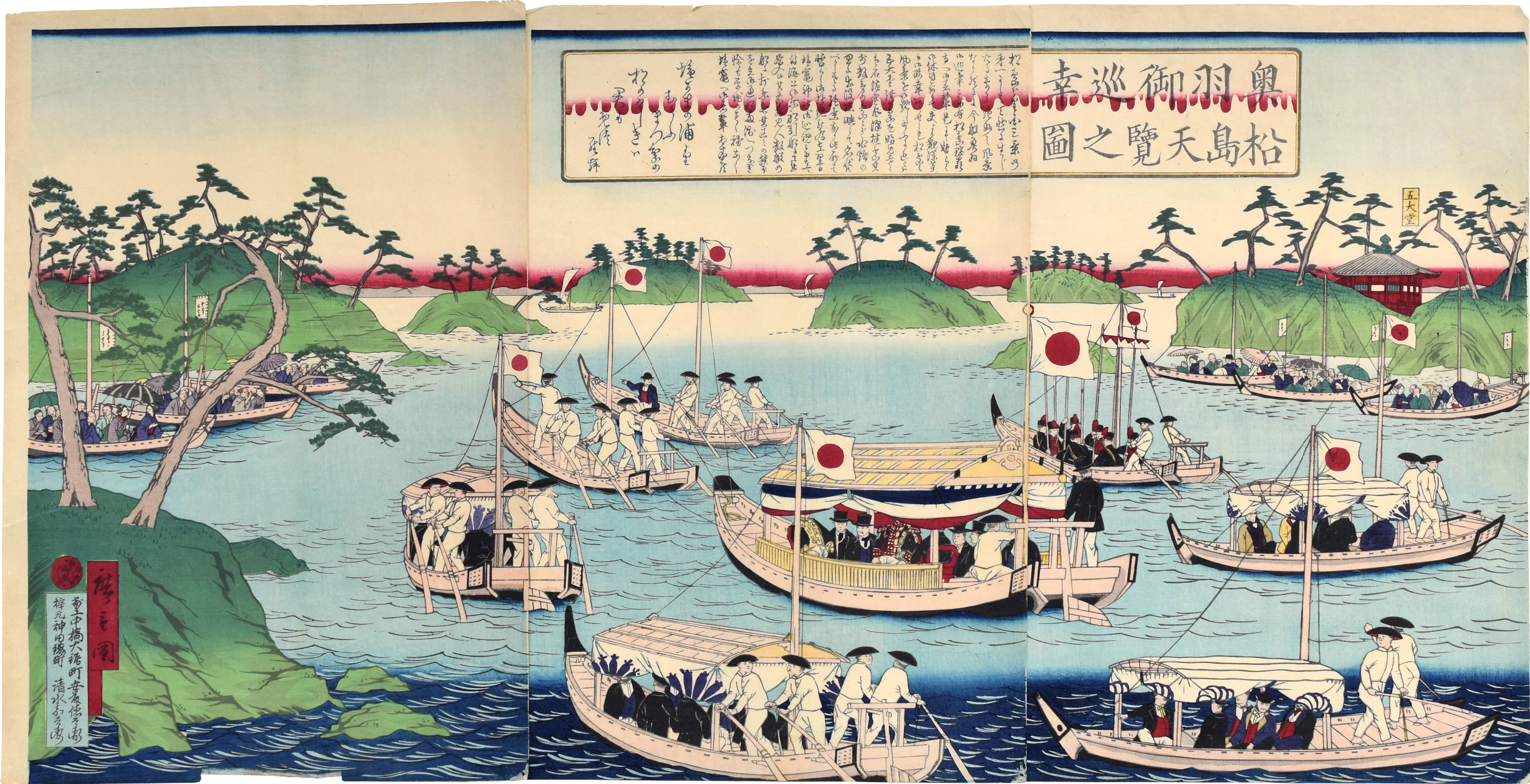
Progression During the Imperial Inspection at Ou, Matsushima. Ukiyo-e by Hiroshige III (1876)

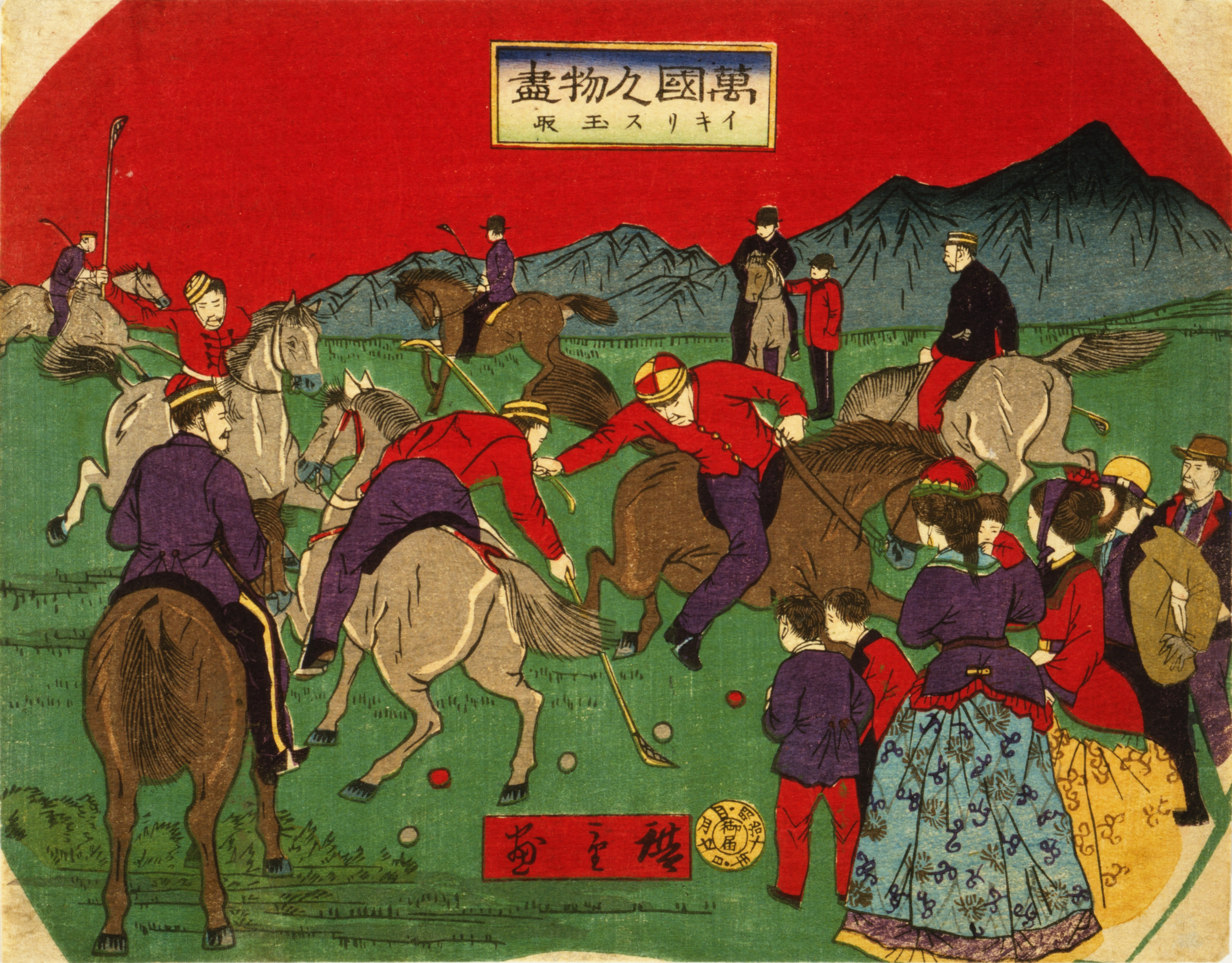
English Polo Match, 1877

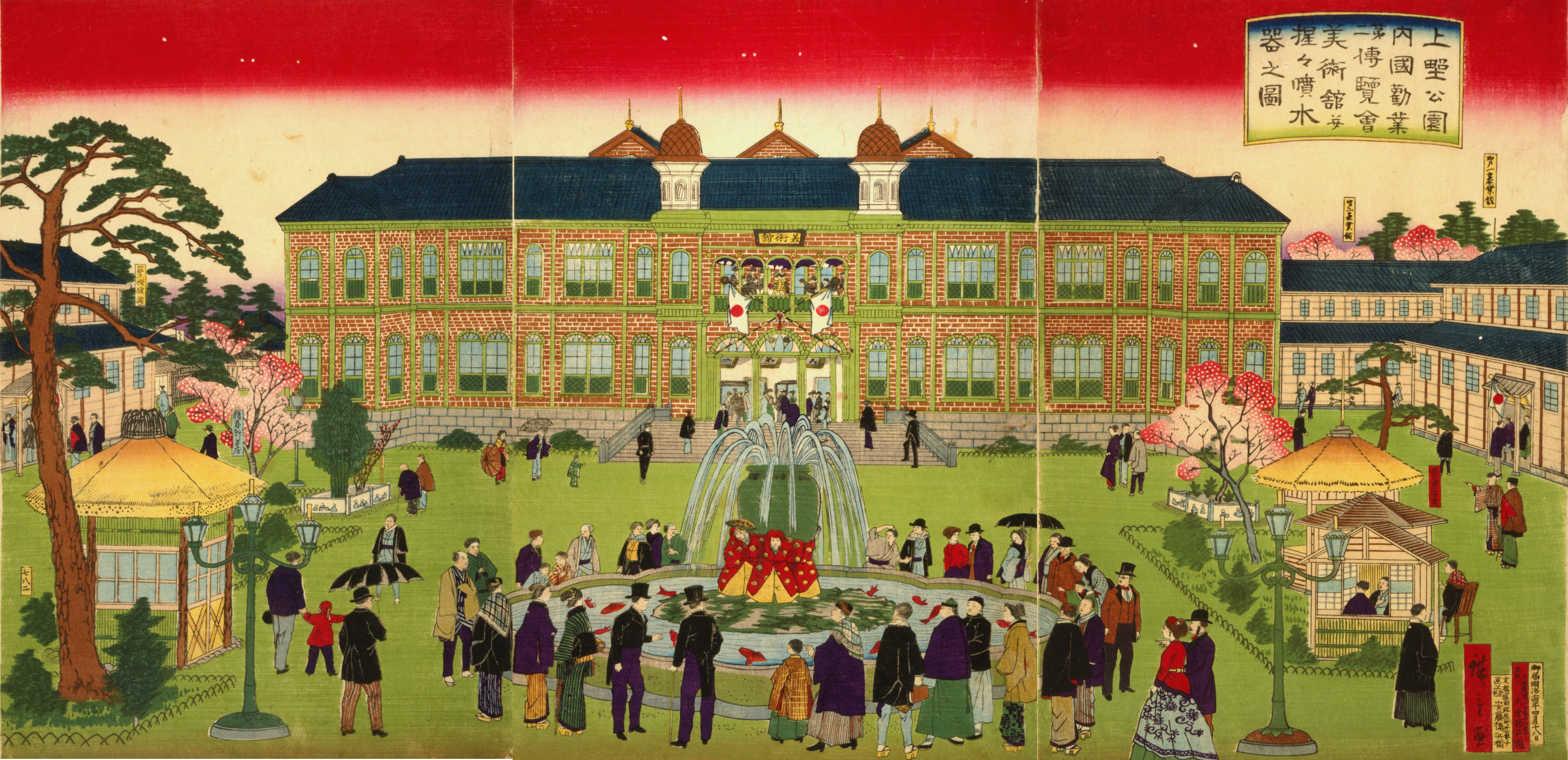
Second national industrial exhibition at Ueno Park, 1881

From The most beautiful place in Tokyo (東京名所第一の勝景, Tōkyō meisho dai ichi no shōkei)

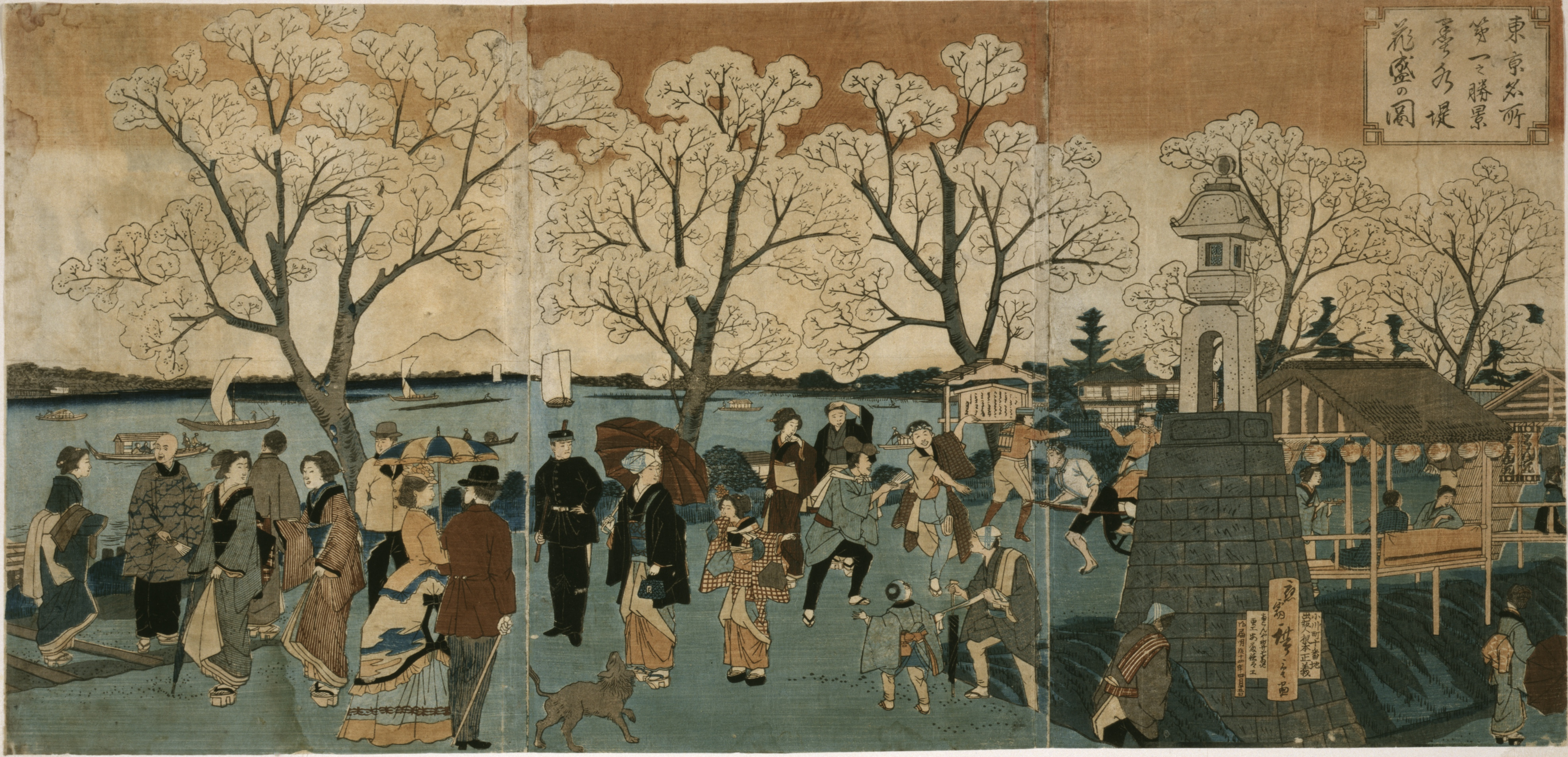
A triptych print showing Japanese and foreign people walking along the Sumida River among cherry trees in full bloom.

== See also ==
- Utagawa school
- Ukiyo-e
