= List of Utagawa school members =

This article contains a list of the members of the Utagawa school of Japanese artists, whose members designed paintings and woodblock prints in the ukiyo-e style from the late Edo period to the end of the Meiji period.

== Naming ==
The art-names of the artists were not produced through a consistent scheme.

The artists of the second generation generally formed their art-names by taking the first kanji of their teacher's name, and adding a different second kanji (e.g. Toyoharu, whose student was Toyohiro). Beginning with the third generation, the names were mainly created by starting with the second kanji of the teacher's name, and adding another one to it (e.g. Toyokuni and his student Kunisada). However, in some cases during this stage the first kanji of the teacher's name was still used for the creation of name (e.g. Toyokuni and Toyoshige). Another, rare, variant was the use of the second kanji of the teacher's name as the second kanji of the pupil's name (e.g. Toyohiro and Naohiro).

Occasionally the same art-name would be re-used by different, un-related artists at different times (e.g. Kunichika or Kunihisa). Equally possible was the use of homonymic names – ones which sound the same, but are written with different kanji (e.g. Hiromasa (広昌) and Hiromasa (広政)).

After an event which left a teacher's name unused, such as their death, retreat from artistic life, or a change in the art-name they used, the former name was often given to a preferred student. Therefore, some names continued to be used, with numbering to distinguish the various holders (e.g. Kuniteru I, II and III). Sometimes these numbers were used by the artists themselves, and sometimes they have been added much later, by people studying the field.

An especially confusing case is the sequence of holders of the name "Toyokuni". After Toyokuni I's death, the name initially was taken over by his student and adoptive son Toyoshige I. It was not used again until Kunisada I started using it in 1844. Kunisada I actually styled himself 'Toyokuni II', ignoring the fact that Toyoshige had already been the second user of the name; he is now uniformly known as 'Toyokuni III', however. His prior art-name, Kunisada, he gave to his son-in-law and adoptive son Kunimasa III, who became now Kunisada II from 1850 onwards. After Kunisada I's death, from about 1870 onwards Kunisada II called himself Toyokuni III (although we now label him Toyokuni IV – the numbering clash caused by Kunisada I's adoption of the name "Toyokuni II" continued to cause confusion), and he handed over the name Kunisada to Kunimasa IV (who thus became Kunisada III). The latter never used the name Toyokuni (although it sometimes alleged that he did so). The literature now indicates the following consecutive holders of these names (with the names they used given in sequence for each one, and using modern numbering for the users of the name "Toyokuni"):

- Toyokuni I
- Toyoshige I / Toyokuni II
- Kunisada I / Toyokuni III
- Kunimasa III / Kunisada II / Toyokuni IV
- Kunimasa IV / Kunisada III / Kōchōrō / Hōsai

Some names used by Utagawa-school artists were also used by artists from other schools (e.g. Toyonobu, Shigenobu, Kunihiro e.a.), so the art-name alone is not sufficient for identification; the school name has to be added for an exact designation.

== Table explanation ==
Founder: Utagawa Toyoharu I (歌川 豊春; 1735–1814)

The left column contains the names of Toyoharu I's students; below and to the right are the names of their students. This pattern is repeated in turn, for their students. For example, Toyohiro in the first column is the teacher of the artists Hirochika through Toyokuma in the second column, and Hiroshige I in the second column is the teacher of the artists Hirokage through Shigeyoshi in the third column; etc.

If known, lifetime dates are given; if those are not known, the period of artistic activity is given. No data will indicate that the names are listed in literature but no datable artwork has yet been found.

The list also includes the names of several female artists; their names are specially marked. In general they were daughters who were taught to draw by their fathers, and were occasionally allowed to design cartouche images for their fathers' works, which they then signed with her own names.

This list is not totally complete: artists of the fifth generation are only partially listed, and artists of the sixth generation are omitted entirely.

About half of the listed names cannot be found in Western literature; the list originates from a Japanese Internet-based project, the Ukiyo-e-shi sōran (浮世絵師総覧, 'Comprehensive Bibliography of Ukiyo-e Artists').

== Table ==
2nd Generation	3rd Generation	4th Generation	5th Generation
Toyoharu II (豊春 二代) fl. 1804-1848			
Toyohide (豊秀) fl. c. 1806-1832			
	Tsukihide (月秀) fl. 1808		
Toyohiro (豊広); 1773-1830			
	Hirochika I (広近) fl. 1820-30		
		Hirochika II (広近 二代); 1835-?	
	Hirokane (広兼) fl. c. 1805-10		
	Hiromaru (広丸) signed Toba Hiromaru (鳥羽 広丸) fl. c. 1810-15		
	Hiromasa (広昌)		
	Hiromasa (広政)		
	Hironobu (広演)		
	Hiroshige I (広重) also used Utashige (歌重); 1797-1858		
		Hirokage (広景) fl. c. 1855-65	
		Shigefusa (重房) fl. c. 1855-70	
		Shigeharu (重春) fl. 1864/65	
		Shigehisa (重久) fl. c. 1850	
		Shigekatsu (重勝) fl. c. 1825-50	
		Shigekiyo (重清) fl. 1855-90	
		Shigemaru (重丸) fl. 1850-54 also student of Kunimaru	
		Shigemasa (重昌) fl. c. 1850-60	
		Shigemasa (重政) also Hiromasa (広政) later Hiroshige III (広重 三代) also used Utashige (歌重); 1842-1894	
			Shōsai Ikkei (昇斎一景) fl. c. 1870-75
		Shigenobu (重宣) later Hiroshige II (広重 二代), then Risshō I (喜斎); 1826-69	
			Kisai Risshō II (喜斎立祥 二代) fl. 1865-70
			Shigetsugu (重次) fl. end Edo period
			Hiroshige IV (広重 四代); 1848-1925
		Shigenobu (重延) fl. end 1860s	
		Shigetoshi (重歳) fl. 1854-60	
		Shiko	
		Shigeyoshi	
	Hirotsune (広恒) fl. beginning 19th century		
	Naohiro (直広) fl. 1789-1801		
	Toyokiyo (豊清) also signed as Kinzō (金蔵); 1799-1820		
	Toyokuma (豊熊) fl. c. 1830		
Toyohisa I (豊久) fl. c. 1801-1818			
	Hisanao (久直)		
	Hisanobu (久信) signed with Hyakusai (百斎) fl. 1800-15		
	Toyohisa II (豊久 二代) fl. c. 1818-c. 1844		
Toyokatsu (豊勝) fl. c. 1804-1830			
Toyokuni I (豊国); 1769-1825			
	Kunichika (国近)		
	Kunichika (国周) a different artist than Kunichika Toyohara 1835-1900		
		Kuninobu (国延)	
	Kunifumi (国文)		
	Kunifusa I (国総) fl. 1810-13		
	Kunifusa (国房) fl. beginning 19th century		
	Kunihide (国英) fl. 1820-44		
	Kunihiki		
	Kunihiko (国彦)		
	Kunihiro (国広) fl. 1816-35		
		Kunihira (国平) fl. c. 1830	
	Kunihisa (国久) fl. 1800-1820 female also student of Toyokuni II		
	Kunikage (国景) fl. c. 1830-40 also student of Toyokuni II		
	Kunikame (国花女); 1810-71 female		
	Kunikane (国兼) fl. c. 1830		
	Kunikatsu (国勝) fl. 1820-30		
		Katsuhide (勝秀)	
		Katsumasa (勝政)	
		Katsunobu (勝信)	
		Katsushige (勝重)	
		Katsuyoshi (勝芳)	
	Kunikiyo I (国清) fl. beginning 19th century		
	Kunimaru (国丸) also signed Bunji (文治); 1793-1829		
		Terundo (輝人)	
		Toshimaru (年丸)	
	Kunimasa I (国政); 1773-1810		
	Kunimasa II (国政 二代) later Kunimune II (国宗 二代); 1792-1857		
	Kunimitsu I (国満) fl. c.1800-30		
		Kunimitsu II (国満 二代) ?-1859	
	Kunimitsu (国光) fl. beginning 19th century		
	Kunimune I (国宗) fl. c. 1820-30		
	Kuninaga (国長); 1790-1827		
	Kuninao I (国直); 1793-1854		
		Ryūshi (竜子) also known as Chikusai Ryūshi (竹斎竜子) fl. 1815	
		Naohisa (直久) fl. c. 1850	
		Naomasa (直政) fl. 1850s	
			Masahisa (政久)
	Kuninobu I (国信) fl. 1814-44		
		Nobufusa (信房) fl. 1830-64	
		Nobuhide I (信秀)	
			Nobuhide II (信秀 二代)
		Nobukazu (信一)	
		Nobukiyo (信清)	
		Nobusada (信貞)	
		Nobuyoki (信与喜)	
	Kunisada I (国貞) later Toyokuni III (豊国 三代); 1786-1865		
		Daiyū (大右) fl. c. 1850	
		Kino (きの, also 喜の) fl. 1855	
		Kuniaki I (国明) fl. 1850-60	
		Kuniaki II (国明 二代); 1835-88	
		Kunichika (国周) later schoolname Toyohara (豊原); 1835-1900	
			Toyohara Chikaharu (周春); 1848-?
			Ryūsai Chikahide (周秀)
			Yukawa Chikamaro (周麿)
			Toyohara Chikamasa (周政)
			Toyohara Chikamasa (周正) fl. Meiji
			Yōsshū Chikanobu (周延); 1838-1912 signed also with Yōshū Chikanobu 楊洲周延
			Morikawa Chikashige (周重) signed also with Otojirō (音次郎) fl. 1869-82
			Toyohara Chikasato (周里) fl. 1887-96
			Toyohara Chikayoshi (周義) fl. 1867-90
			Toyohara Chikayoshi (周嘉)
			Yōsai Nobukazu (延一); 1872-1944
			Utagawa Kuniteru III (国輝 三代) fl. 1880s
		Kunifuku (国福) fl. 1854-64	
		Kunifusa II (国房 二代); 1834-83	
		Kuniharu (国晴) fl. 1855-83	
		Kunihisa (国寿)	
		Kunihisa II (国久 二代); 1832-91	
			Kunimine (国峰); 1861-1944
		Kunihisa III (国久 三代)	
		Kunikake (国魁)	
		Kunikazu (国員) fl. 1850s	
		Kunikiyo II (国清 二代) ?- 1887	
		Kunimaro I (国麿) signed also Maromaru (麿丸) fl. 1850-75	
			Kunimaro II (国麿 二代) fl. c. 1860
		Kunimasa III (国政 三代) later Kunisada II (国貞 二代) later Toyokuni IV (豊国 四代); 1823-80	
			Kunitsuna II (国綱 二代) before Kuniteru II (国輝 二代); 1830-74
			Kuniyuki (国雪)
			Kuniyuki (国幸) fl. c. 1870
			Masahisa (政久) fl. end 19th century
			Toyonobu (豊宣); 1859-86
		Kunimasa IV (国政 四代) later Kunisada III (国貞 三代) later Kōchōrō (香蝶楼) later Hōsai (豊斎); 1848-1920 also student of Kunisada II	
			Kokunimasa (小国政); 1874-1944
			Kunimasa V (国政 五代)
			Kunimune (国梅) fl. 1880s
			Kunitora II (国虎 二代) ?-1896
			Masanobu (政信) fl. 1882-87
		Kunimasu (国益) fl. c. 1850	
		Kunimichi II (国道 二代, also written 国路) fl. c. 1850	
		Kunimine II (国峯 二代) fl. beginning Meiji	
		Kunimitsu II (国光 二代)	
		Kunimori II (国盛 二代) fl. c. 1850	
		Kunimura (国邑) fl. c. 1850	
		Kuninobu II (国信 二代) fl. c. 1860	
		Kunisato (国郷) ?-1858	
		Kunishige (国茂) fl. end Edo period	
		Kunishige (国重) fl. c. 1850-70	
		Kunishige (国繁)	
		Kunitaka (国孝) signed also Ichigyokusai (一玉斎) fl. 1859-63	
		Kunitama (国玉) fl. 1850s	
		Kuniteru I (国輝) also Sadashige (貞重) also Kunimitsu (国光) fl. 1820-60	
			Teruhisa (輝久)
			Terukuni (輝国)
		Kuniteru II (国輝 二代), also written 国てる) since 1855 Kunihiko II (国彦 二代); 1830-74	
		Kunitoki II (国時 二代) fl. 1860s	
		Kunitoku (国得) fl. c. 1855	
		Kunitomi II (国富 二代) fl. c. 1860	
		Kunitomo II (国朝 二代) fl. 1850	
		Kunitoshi (国歳) fl. 1868-1912	
		Kunitoshi (国利, also written 邦年); 1847-99	
		Kunitoshi (国年)	
		Kunitsugu II (国次 二代)	
		Kuniyoshi (国美) fl. c. 1850	
		Kuniyuki II (国幸 二代) fl. 1852	
		Sadaaki (貞章)	
		Sadachika (貞周)	
		Sadafusa (貞房) fl. 1830-50	
			Fusakiyo (房清) fl. 1846
			Fusatane (房種) also signed Ōsai (櫻斎) fl. 1830-80
		Sadaharu (貞晴, also written 貞春) fl. c. 1825	
		Sadahide (貞秀); 1807-73	
		Sadahiko (貞彦) fl. c. 1850	
		Sadahiro / Hirosada (貞広 / 広貞) also known as Konishi Hirosada (小西 広貞) also student of Sadamasu/Kunimasu fl. 1830-54	
			Sadahiro II / Hirosada II (貞広 二代 / 広貞 二代); 1840-1910
		Sadahisa (貞久)	
		Sadakage I (貞景, also written 貞影) fl. 1820-44	
			Kagematsu (景松, also written 影松) fl. c. 1840-50
			Kagetoshi (景年) fl. c. 1830-40
		Sadakage II (貞景 二代) fl. 1850-81	
		Sadakame-jo(貞歌女) female	
			Meirindō Kakuju-jo (明林堂鶴寿女) fl. 1861-63 female
		Sadakane (貞兼) fl. 1815-42	
		Sadakatsu (貞勝)	
		Sadakiyo (貞清) fl. 1830	
		Sadakoma (貞駒) fl 1860s	
		Sadakuma (貞熊)	
		Sadakuni (貞国)	
		Sadamasa (貞雅)	
		Sadamasa (貞政) fl. c. 1850	
		Sadamasu / Kunimasu (貞升 / 国升) signed also with Yukimasu (行升) fl. c.1830-54	
			Nobukatsu (信勝) fl. end Edo period
			Sadayoshi (貞芳) also student of Kunisada I fl. 1837-50
			Hasegawa Sadanobu I (長谷川 貞信); 1807-79
		Sadamaru (貞丸)	
		Sadamasa (貞雅)	
		Sadamasu (貞益) fl. c. 1850	
		Sadamine fl. c.1830-44	
		Sadamine fl. c.1830-50s	
		Sadamori (貞盛)	
		Sadamura (貞邑, also written 貞村) fl. c. 1850	
		Sadanao (貞猶)	
		Sadanobu (貞延)	
		Sadanobu (貞宣) fl. c. 1850	
		Sadanobu (貞信) fl. 1820-30	
			Sadanobu II (貞信 二代) fl. Meiji
		Sadaoka (貞岡)	
		Sadashige (貞繁) fl. 1820 and 1850	
		Sadataka (貞孝)	
		Sadatake (貞武)	
		Sadatomo (貞知) fl. 1850	
		Sadatora (貞虎) fl. 1820-44	
		Sadatoshi (貞利)	
		Sadatoshi (貞年) fl. c. 1850	
		Sadatsugu (貞次) fl. 1830s	
		Sadatsuna (貞綱) fl. 1830s	
		Sadayoshi (貞美) fl. c. 1850	
		Sadayuki (貞幸) fl. 1830-40	
		Takahiro (孝広)	
		Toyoshige III (豊重 三代) ?-1931	
		Yasu (安) fl. c. 1850	
	Kunishige (国繁) fl. 1815		
	Kunitame (国為)		
	Kunitane (国種) fl. c. 1830		
		Taneharu (種春)	
		Tanekage (種景)	
		Tanekiyo (種清)	
		Tanemasa (種政)	
		Tanenobu (種信)	
		Taneshige (種繁)	
	Kunitaka (国孝)		
	Kunitake (国武)		
		Takemitsu (武光)	
		Takeshige (武重)	
		Taketora (武虎)	
	Kunitaki (国瀧)		
	Kunitaku (国宅)		
	Kuniteru (国照); 1808-76 also student of Kuninao		
	Kunitetsu (国鐵)		
	Kunitome-jo (国登女) female		
	Kunito (国登)		
	Kunitoki I (国時)		
	Kunitoku (国登久)		
	Kunitora I (国虎); 1789 ?-1860 ?		
	Kunitsugu (国次); 1800-1861		
	Kunitsugu (国継) fl. 1820-30		
	Kunitsuna (国綱); 1805-68 also student of Kunisada I		
	Kunitsune (国常)		
	Kuniwaka (国若)		
	Kuniyasu I (国安); 1794-1832		
		Yasuharu (安春)	
		Yasuhide (安秀) fl. 1829-30	
		Yasukiyo (安清)	
		Yasumine (安峯); 1791-1842	
		Yasunobu (安信) fl. 1830s	
		Yasushige (安重)	
		Yasutsune (安常)	
	Kuniyasu II (国安 二代) fl. 1830-44		
	Kuniyoshi (国芳); 1798-1861		
		Harusada II (春貞 二代) also known as Yasukawa Harusada II (保川春貞 二代); 1830-87	
		Kyōsai (暁斎); 1831-89 founded own school	
		Yono (世の)	
		Yoshiaki (芳明)	
		Yoshichika (芳近) ?-1868	
		Yoshiei (芳栄) ?-1869	
		Yoshifusa-jo I (芳房女) fl. c. 1850	
		Yoshifusa II (芳房 二代); 1837-1860	
		Yoshifuji (芳藤, also written よし藤) ?-1886	
			Fujiyoshi (藤よし) fl. 1867
		Yoshigiku (芳菊)	
		Yoshigiri (芳桐)	
		Yoshiharu (芳春, also written 芳晴) also signed Ikusaburō (幾三郎); 1828-1888	
			Harutomi (春富)
			Harunaka (春中)
		Yoshihide (芳秀); 1832-1902	
		Yoshihide (芳栄) usually read Yoshiei	
		Yoshihiko (芳彦)	
		Yoshihisa (芳久) fl. c. 1862-63	
		Yoshihiro (芳広) ?-1884	
		Yoshiiku (芳幾); 1833-1904	
			Ikuhide (幾英) also Kobayashi Ikuhide (小林 幾英) fl. 1880-1898
		Yoshijo (芳女); Kuniyoshi's younger daughter, fl. end Edo period	
		Yoshikabu (芳蕪)	
		Yoshikado (芳廉) fl. c. 1850	
		Yoshikatsu (芳勝) fl. c. 1850	
		Yoshikage (芳影)	
		Yoshikage (芳景) ?-1892	
			Kagetora (景虎)
			Kagehisa (景久)
		Yoshikane (芳兼) also known as Takeuchi Tachō (竹内田蝶); 1832-1881	
		Yoshikata (芳形); 1841-1864	
		Yoshikazu (芳員) fl. 1850-60	
		Yoshikiyo (芳清)	
		Yoshikono (芳古野) fl. c. 1850	
		Yoshikuni (芳州) fl. beginning Meiji	
		Yoshikuni (芳国) fl. c. 1850	
		Yoshimasu (芳升)	
		Yoshimaro (芳麿) an earlier name of Utagawa Yoshihiro (歌川芳広)	
		Yoshimaru I (芳丸) fl. c. 1850	
		Yoshimaru II (芳丸 二代); 1844-1907	
		Yoshimasa (芳政) fl. c. 1830-60	
		Yoshimi (芳見)	
		Yoshimitsu (芳満); 1837-1910	
		Yoshimura (芳村, also written 芳邨); 1846-?	
		Yoshimori I (芳盛); 1830-85	
			Yoshimori II (芳盛 二代) before Kuniharu 国晴; 1854-?
		Yoshimoto (芳基)	
		Yoshimune I (芳宗); 1817-80	
			Yoshimune II (芳宗 二代); 1863-1941
		Yoshinaka (芳中)	
		Yoshinao (芳直) fl. 1854-56	
		Yoshinobu (芳延); 1838-1890	
		Yoshinobu (芳信) fl. 1860s	
		Yoshisada (芳貞) signed also with Kiyonobu (清貞) fl. Meiji	
		Yoshisato (芳里) fl. c. 1850	
		Yoshisato (芳郷)	
		Yoshisen (芳仙) also read Hōsen	
		Yoshishige (芳重, also written 吉重) fl. c. 1840-55	
		Yoshitada (芳忠) fl. c. 1850	
		Yoshitama-jo (芳玉女) signed also with Shimizu (清水); 1836-70 female	
		Yoshitame (芳為)	
		Yoshitani (芳谷)	
		Yoshitaka (芳鷹) fl. 1850s	
		Yoshitaki (芳瀧, also written 芳滝); 1841-99	
		Yoshitatsu (芳辰)	
		Yoshiteru (芳照) fl. 1850-90	
		Yoshiteru (芳輝); 1808-91	
		Yoshitomi (芳富) fl. beginning Meiji period	
		Yoshitora (芳虎) fl. 1830-1870	
			Toratane (虎種) fl. Meiji
			Torashige (虎重) fl. Meiji
		Yoshitori-jo (芳鳥女) signed also with Kuniyoshi musume (国芳女), musume Tori (女登里) and Tori-jo (登理女); 1797-1861 female	
		Yoshitoshi (芳年); 1839-92 founded own school	
		Yoshitoyo I (芳豊); 1830-66? also student of Kunisada I	
			Yoshitoyo II (芳豊 二代); 1844-1907
		Yoshitsuna (芳綱) fl. end Edo period	
		Yoshitsuru I (芳鶴, also written 芳霍); 1789-1846	
			Yoshitsuru II (芳鶴 二代)
		Yoshitsuya I (芳艶); 1822-66	
			Kazutoyo (一豊) name also read Ichitoyo also used name Tsuyatoyo 艶豊
			Tsuyanaga (艶長) fl. 1863
			Tsuyamasa (艶政)
			Yoshitsuya II (芳艶 二代) fl. 1870s
		Yoshiume (芳梅); 1819-79	
			Gyokutei (玉亭) before Yoshimine (芳峰) fl. Meiji
		Yoshiyuki (芳雪, also written 蕙雪) ?-c. 1861	
		Yoshizane (芳真)	
	Kuniyuki I (国幸)		
	Kunizō (国蔵)		
	Toyoshige I (豊重) probably before Kunishige (国重) later Toyokuni II (豊国 二代); 1777?-1835		
		Kuniharu (国春); 1803-39	
		Kuniharu (国晴)	
		Kunihiro (国弘) fl. c. 1825-40	
		Kunikazu (国一)	
		Kunimichi I (国道)	
		Kunimori I (国盛) fl. c.1820-40	
		Kunimoya (国靄, also written 国鶴) fl. 1830s	
		Kunimura (国邑)	
		Kuninao II (国直 二代) fl. Meiji	
		Kunioki (国興)	
		Kunishi (国誌) ?-c. 1850	
		Kunitada (国忠)	
		Kunitomi I (国富) fl. 1820-44	
			Tominobu (富信) fl. c. 1840-45
		Kunitomo (国朝) fl. 1830s	
		Kunitomo (国與)	
		Kunitsuru I (国靏); 1807-78	
			Kunimatsu (国松) also Toyoshige III (豊重 三世) and Fukudō Kunimatsu (福堂 国松); 1855-1944
			Kunitsuru II (国靏 二代); 1852-1919
		Toyoshige II (国重 二代) fl. 1840-50	
		Toyotoshi (豊年) fl. c. 1830	
		Kunishige II (国重 二代) fl. 1818?-44	
		Kunimasu (国益) fl. 1823-25	
Toyomaro (豊麿) fl. end 18th century			
Toyomaru I (豊丸) before Katsukawa Shunrō II fl. 1785-97			
Toyonobu (豊信) fl. 1770-80			
Teachers unknown:
Hidemaru (秀丸)			
Naotsuna (直綱) fl. c. 1840			
Kagemasu (景升) fl. Meiji			
Kintarō (金太郎) fl. c. 1880			
Kuniama?? (国天雷) fl. 1890s			
Kunihama (国濱) fl. beginning 19th century			
Kunihide (国英) fl. c. 1890			
Kunikazu (国一) also Odake Kunikazu (尾竹国一) fl. 1887			
Kuniyasu (国保) also Sekisai Kuniyasu (石斎国保) fl. 1880-90			
Suekatsu (季勝) fl. beginning 19th century			
Toyokage (豊景)			
Toyonaga (豊長) fl. beginning 19th century			
Yasuzō (保蔵) fl. c. 1840			
Yoshimaru (美丸) also Kitao Shigemasa II (北尾 重政 二世) and Kitagawa Yoshimaro (喜多川 美麿) fl. c. 1810-40			
