= Hiroshige II =

Japanese painter

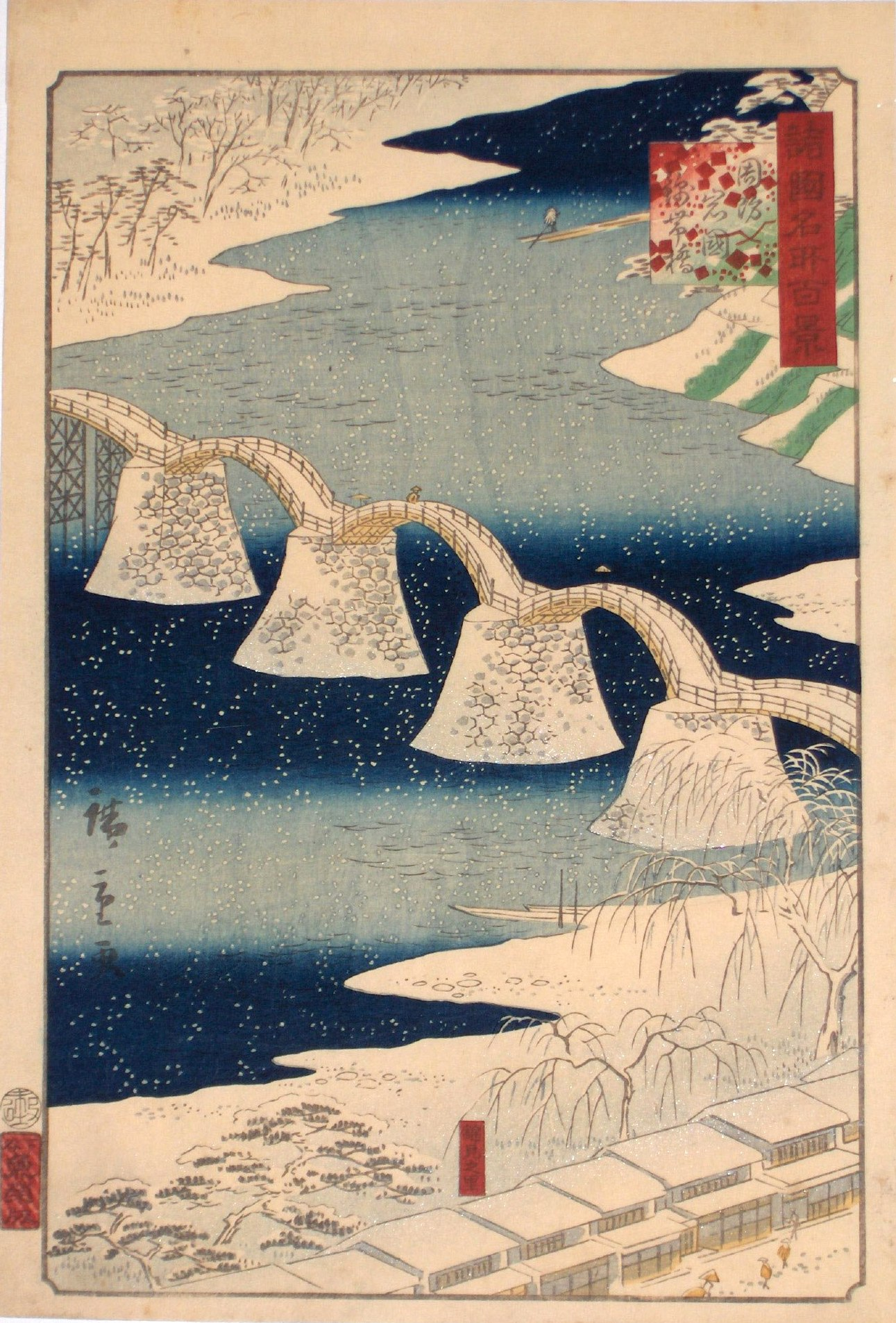
Suō Iwakuni, woodblock print, 1859, from the series One Hundred Views of Japan

Hiroshige II (二代目 歌川広重, Ni-daime Utagawa Hiroshige; 1826 – 17 September 1869) was a Japanese designer of ukiyo-e art. He inherited the name Hiroshige II following the death in 1858 of his master Hiroshige, whose daughter he married. In 1865 he moved from Edo to Yokohama after dissolving his marriage and began using the name Kisai Risshō (喜斎立祥; alternate pronunciation: Ryūshō). His work so resembles that of his master that scholars have often confused them.

== Life and career ==
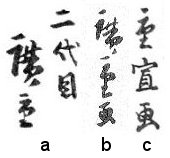
The signatures of Hiroshige II - a) nidaime Hiroshige, b) Hiroshige ga, and c) Shigenobu ga

Born Suzuki Chinpei (鈴木鎮平) in 1826, it is said that he was born to a fireman, as was his master Hiroshige to whom he became apprenticed under the name Shigenobu at an unknown age. His earliest known work is the illustrations for a book called Twenty-four Paragons of Japan and China from 1849.

Hiroshige II produced a large number of commissioned work in the 1850s in the style of the elder Hiroshige, and often signed his work Ichiryūsai mon ("student of Ichiryūsai", another art name of Hiroshige I's), and from c. 1853 to 1858 simply as Ichiryūsai. In 1858, he married Hiroshige I's daughter Otatsu after the master's death and inherited the Hiroshige name, as well as the names Ichiryūsai and Ryūsai.

The artist moved from Edo to Yokohama in 1865 after dissolving his marriage and began using the name Kisai Risshō (喜斎立祥; alternate pronunciation: Ryūshō). During this decade he produced a number of collaborative print series, particularly with Kunisada, who had earlier worked with Hiroshige I. In his final years he turned mainly to decorating works intended for export, such as tea chests, kites, and lanterns. On 17 September 1869 he died at the age of 44.

Hiroshige I took on few students; Hiroshige II was the most successful of these. Among Hiroshige I's other pupils were Shōsai Ikkei, Shigemaru (active 1848–1853), Utagawa Shigekiyo (active 1860–1890) and Utagawa Hirokage, the last of whom is best known for the 1860–1861 series Edo Meisho Dōke Zukushi and the 1859 triptych Aomono Sakana Gunzei Daikassen no Zu. His works have often been confounded with those of his master, which they resemble closely in style, subject, and signature. Early Western scholars did not even recognize him as a separate artist.

Another pupil of the first Hiroshige, Shigemasa, later married the master's daughter, Otatsu, and also began using the name Hiroshige; this artist now is known as Hiroshige III.

== Galleries ==
One Hundred Views of Japan

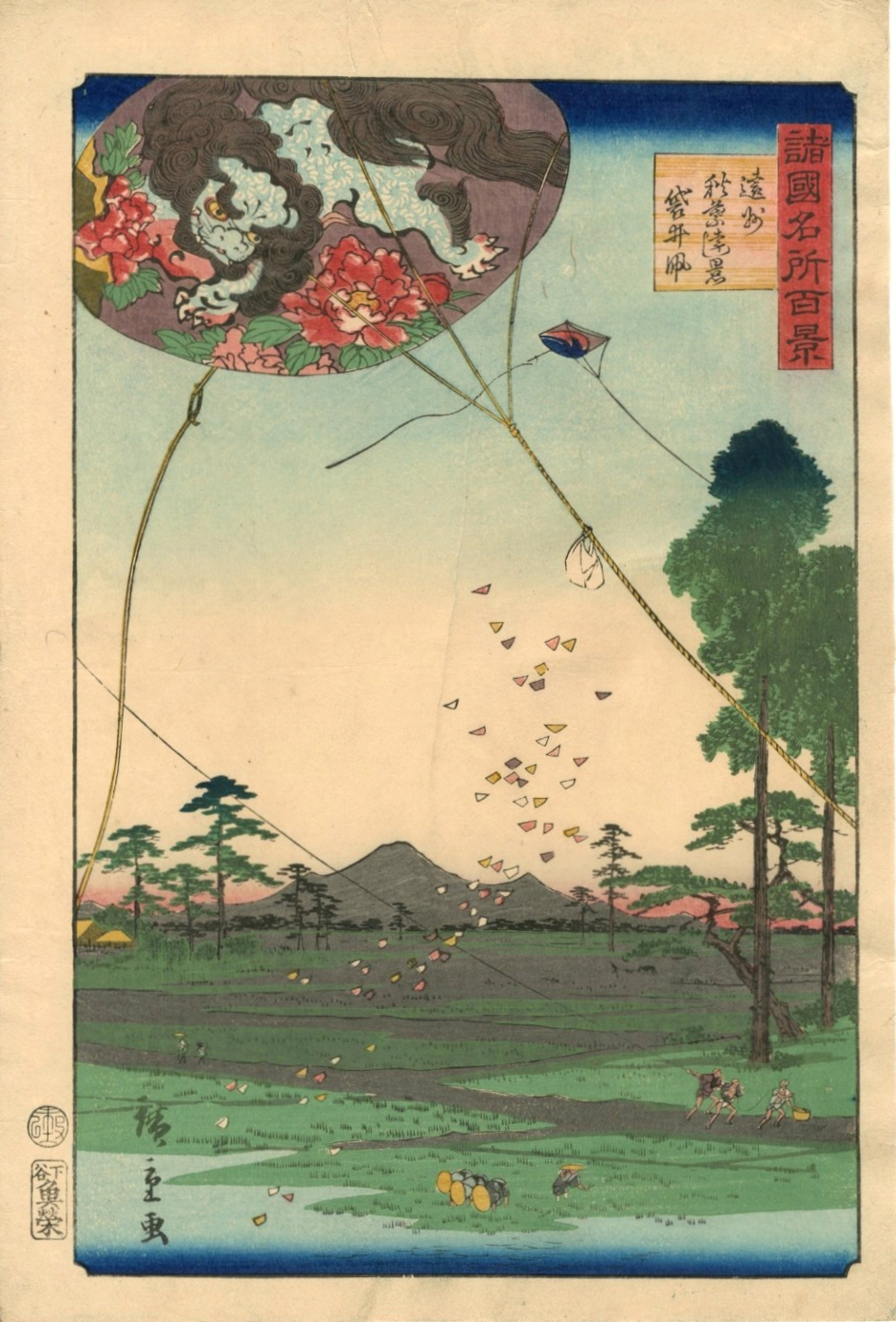
Enshū Akiha Enkei Fukuroi Tako, 1859

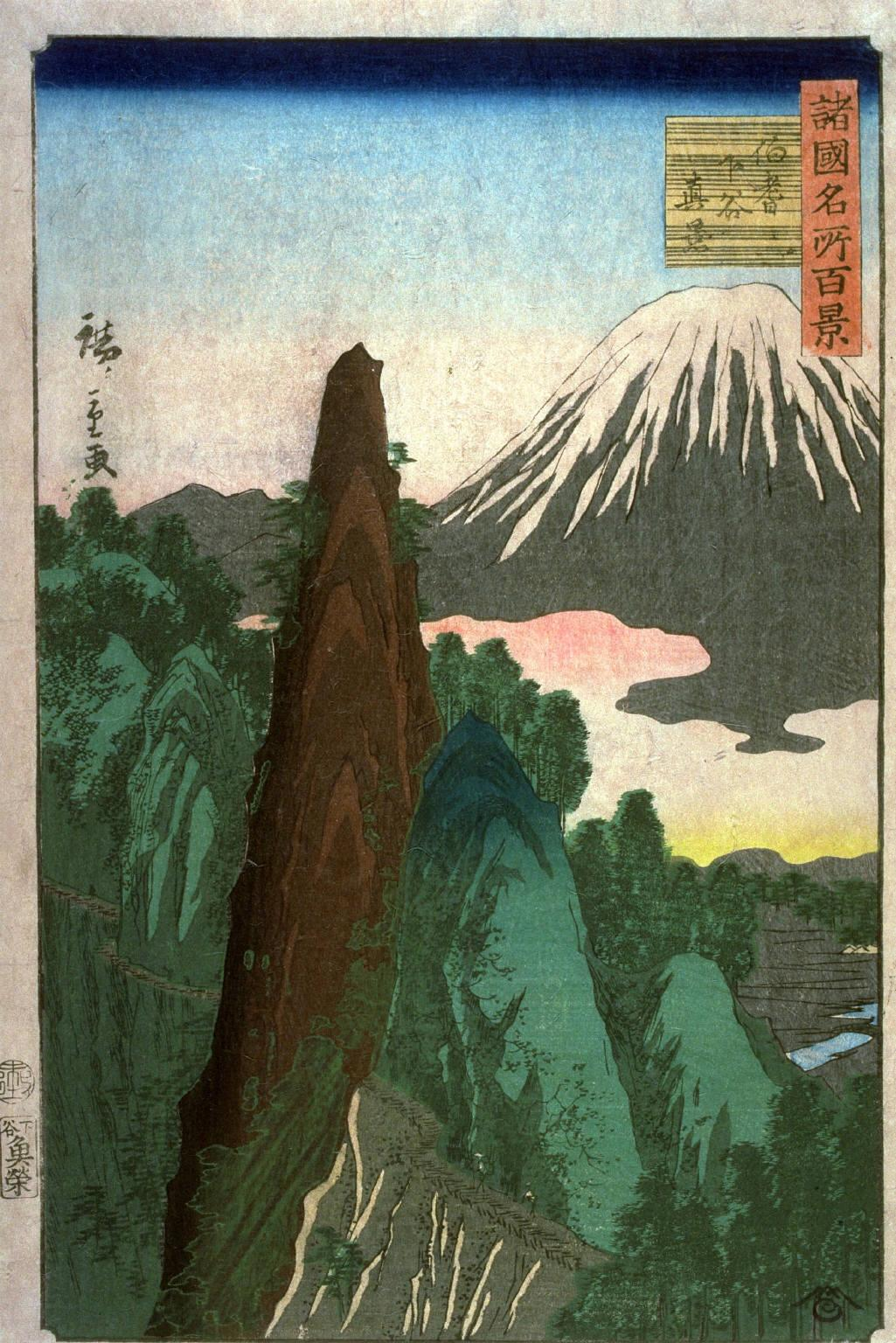
Hōki Shimodani, 1859

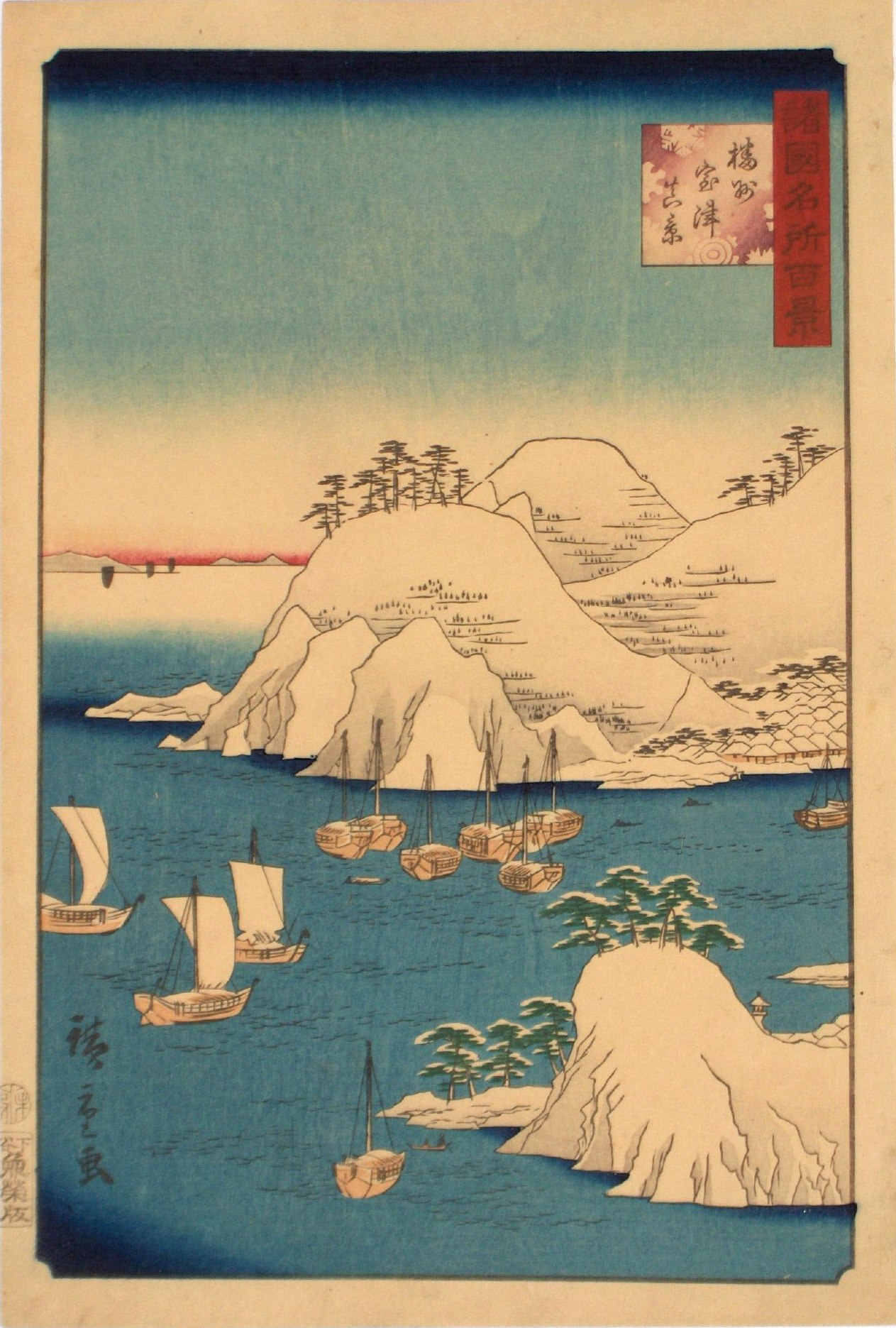
Banshū Murotsu, 1859

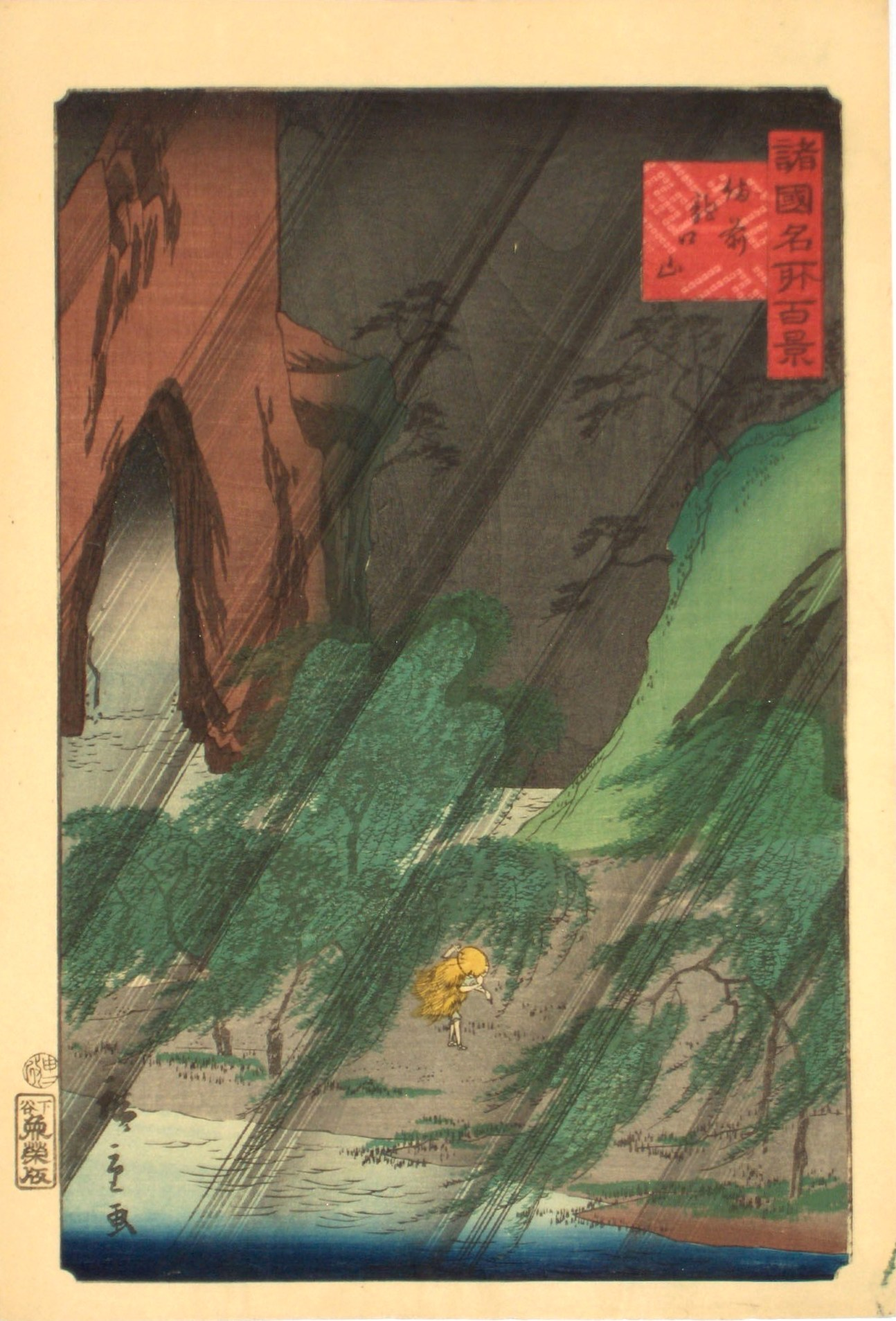
Bizen Tatsunokuchiyama, 1860

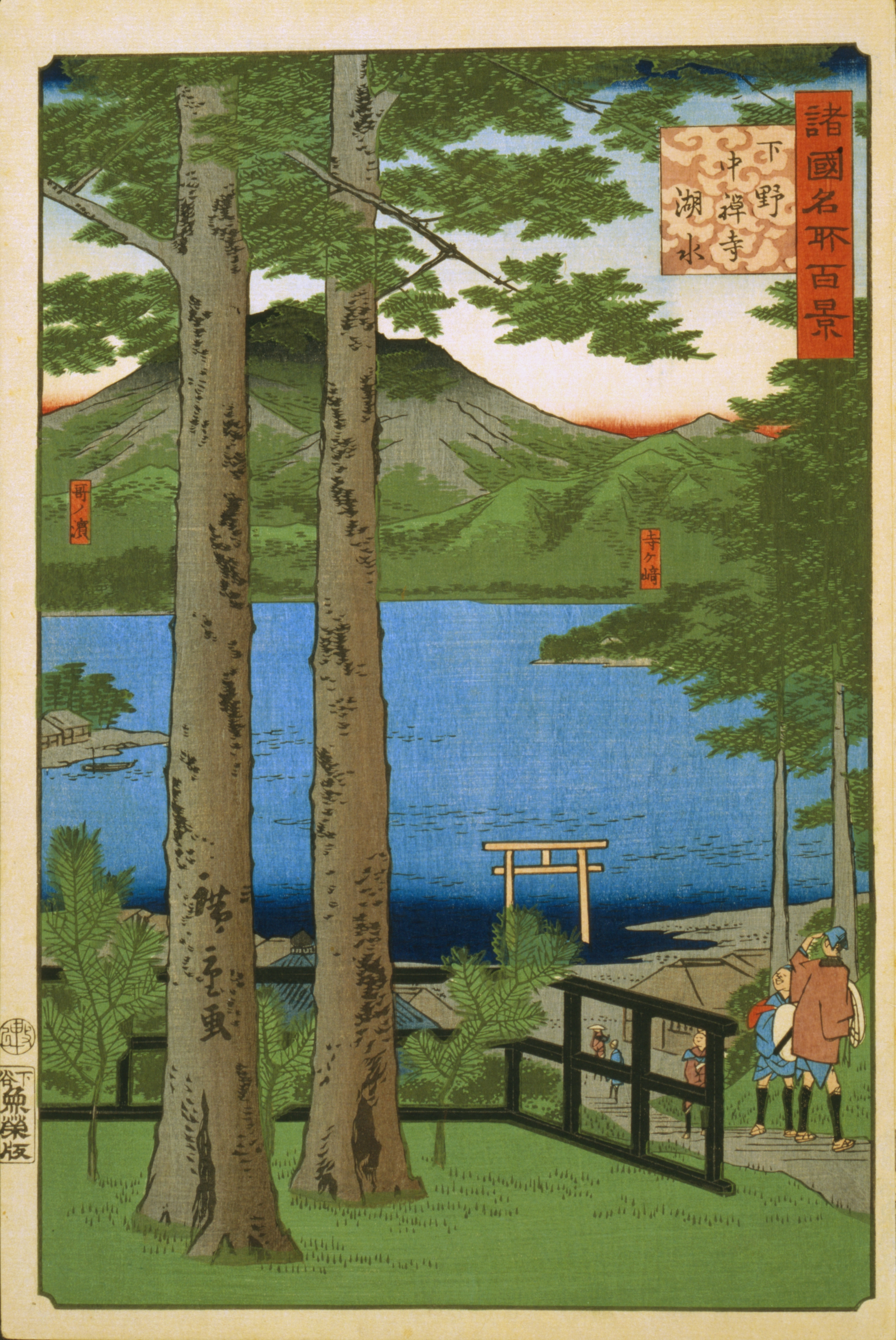
Chūzenji Lake in Shimozuke Province, 1860

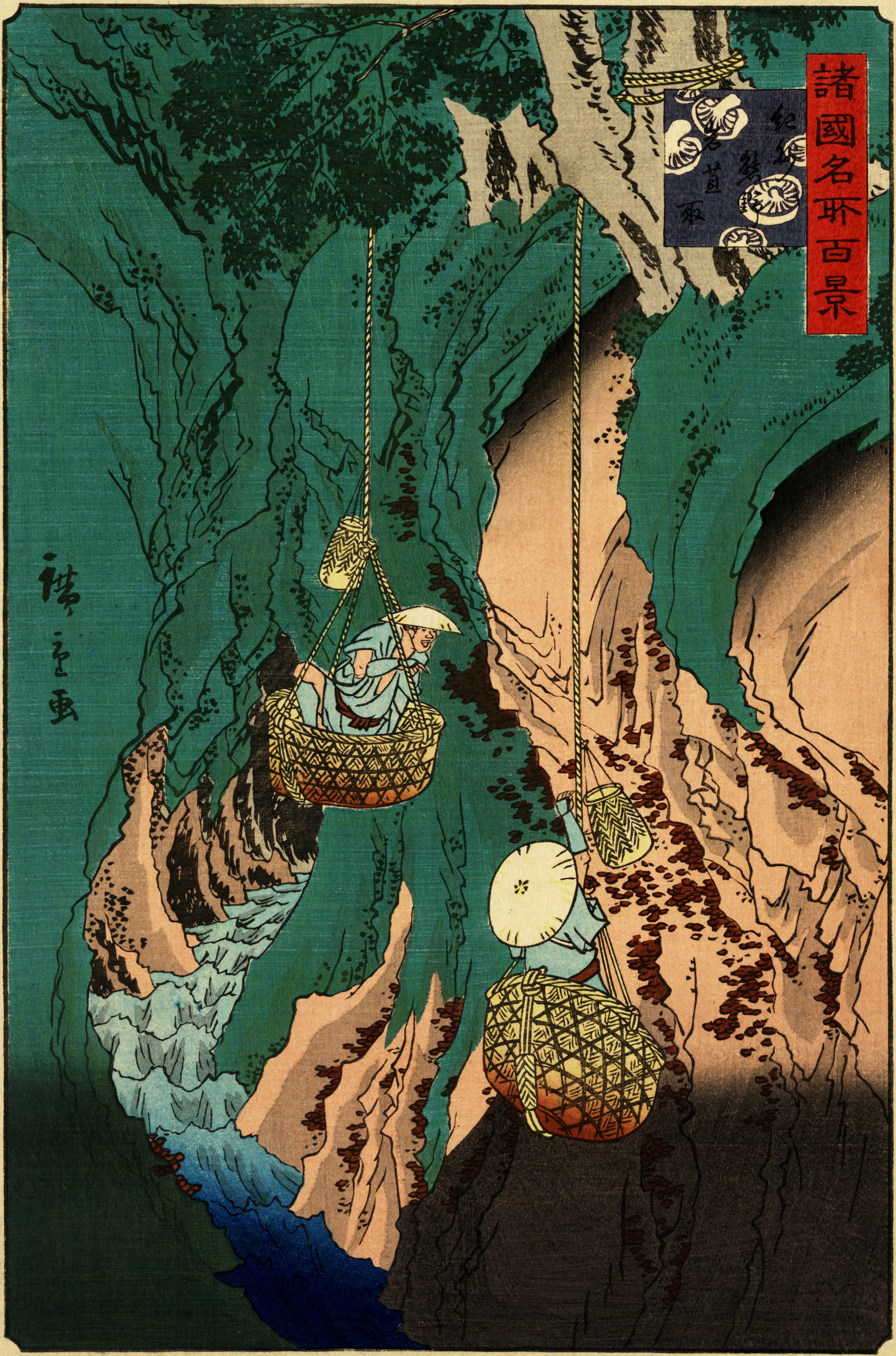
Mushroom gathering at Kumano in Kishū, 1860
Other Works by Hiroshige II

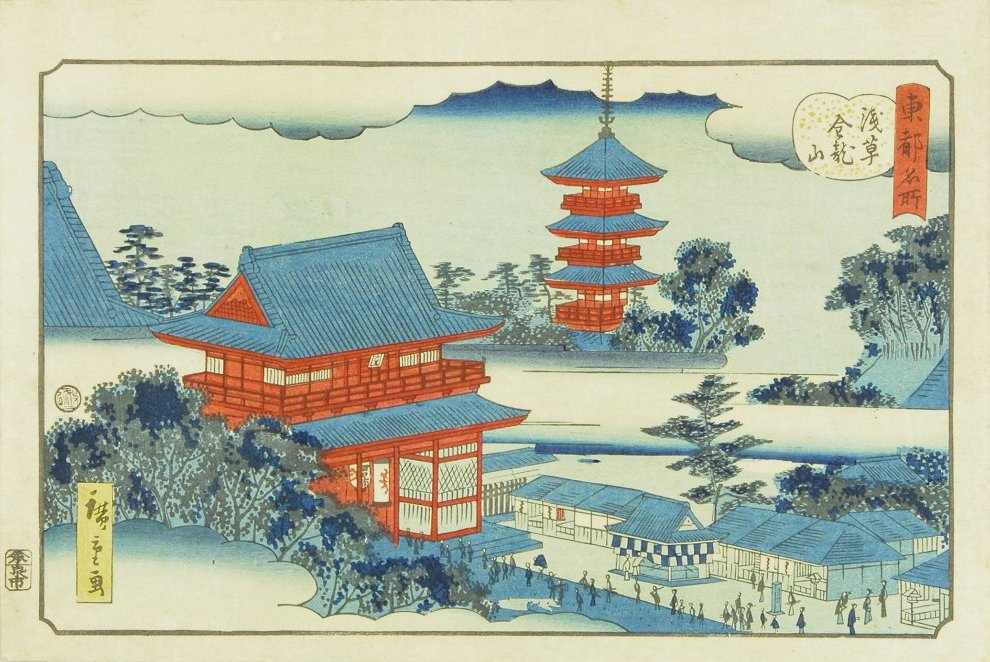
Kinryuzan Temple in Asakusa from the series Famous Places in the Eastern Capital, mid-19th century

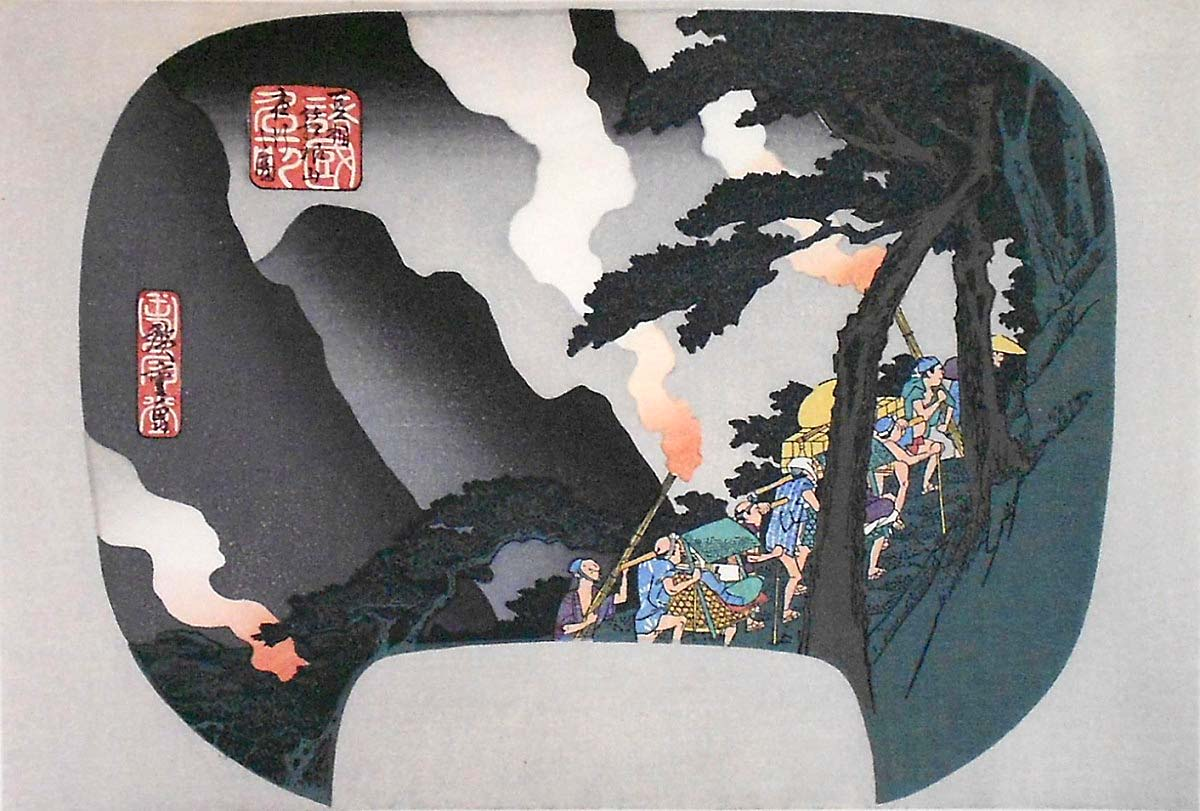
Passage through Hakone from the series Famous Places in Various Provinces, 1850s

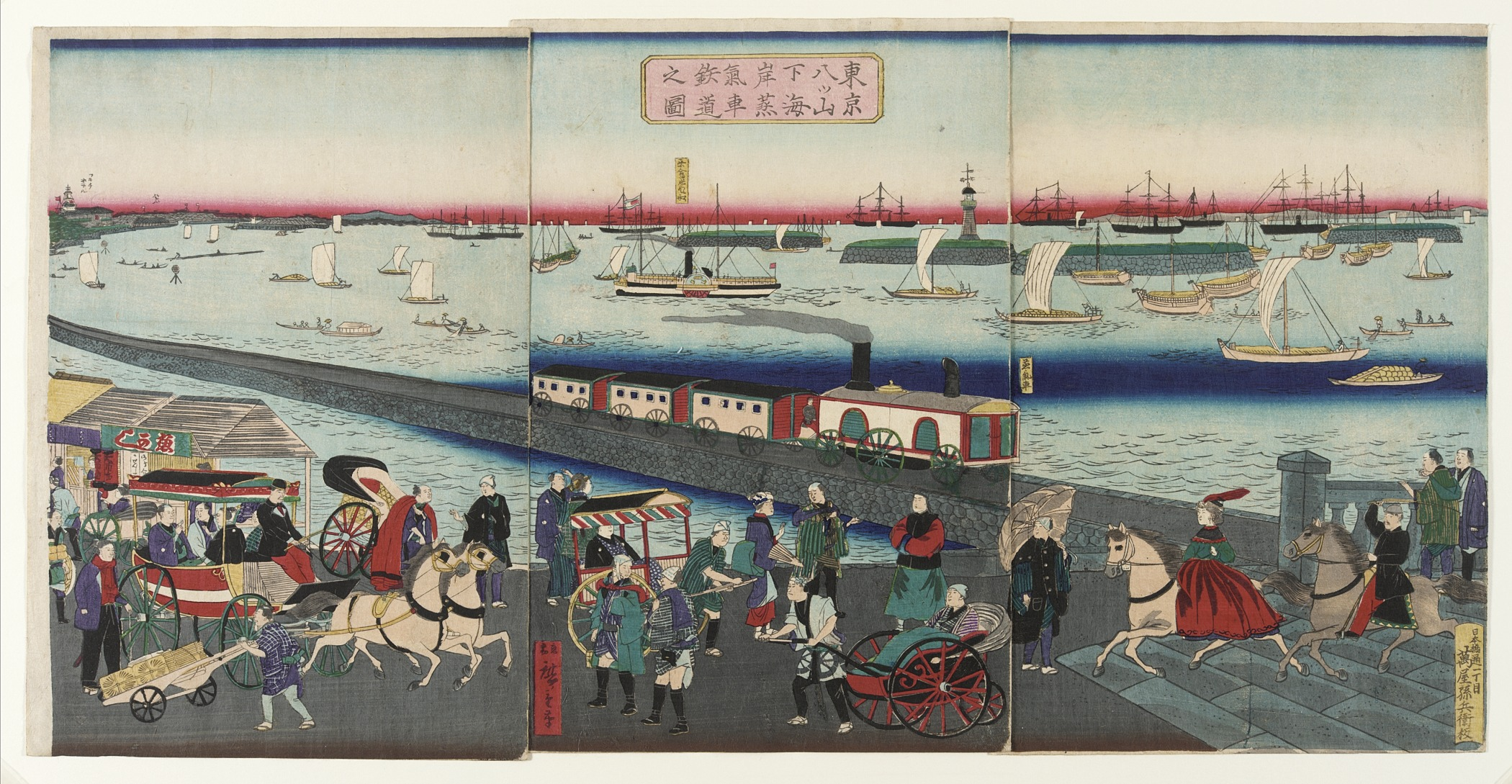
Steam Engine Railway in Yatsuyama, 1860s

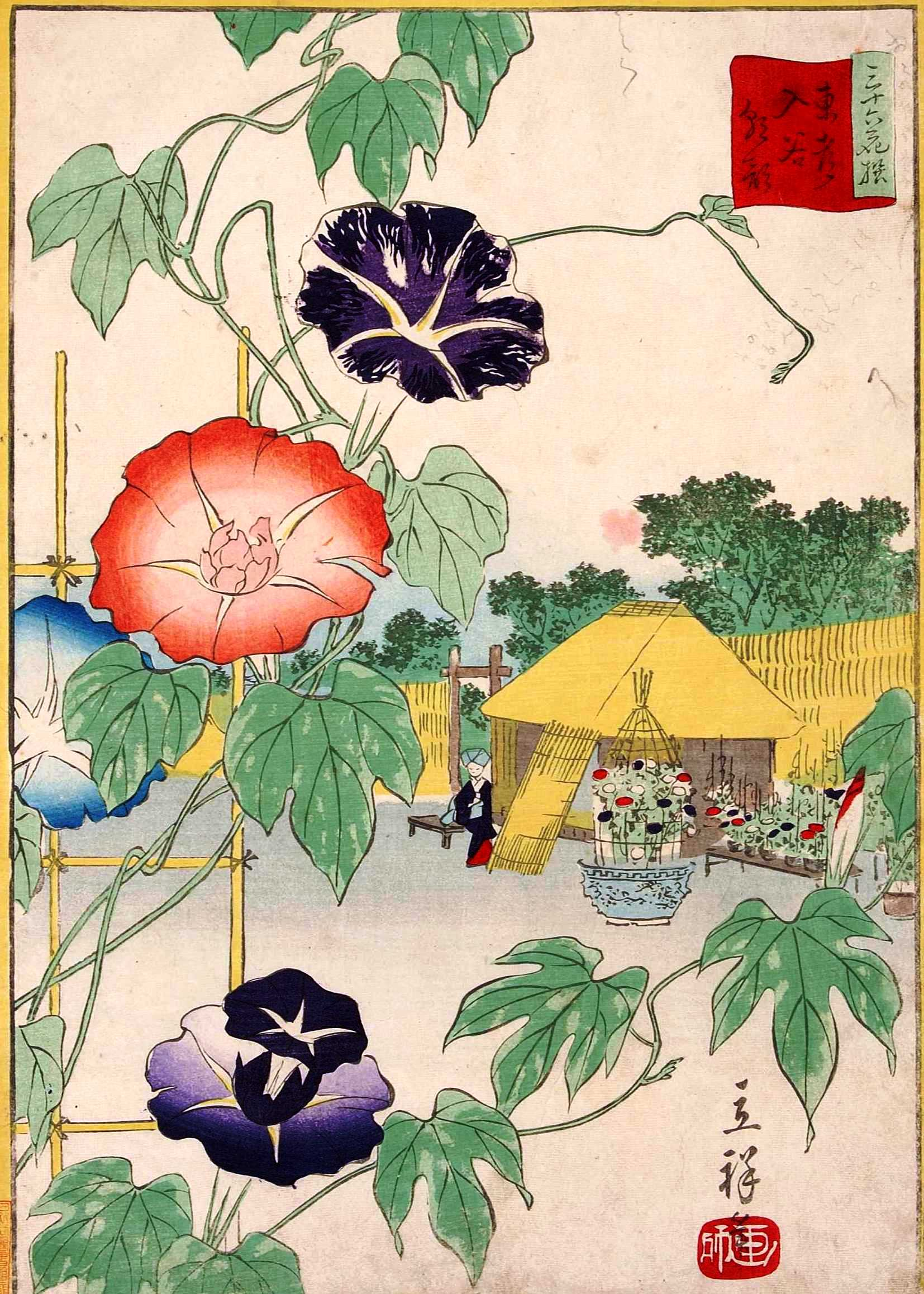
Morning Glories in Iriya, Eastern Capital from Thirty-six Selected Flower Scenes, 1866

== See also ==
- Utagawa school
- List of Utagawa school members
