= Kuniteru =

19th-century Japanese ukiyo-e artist

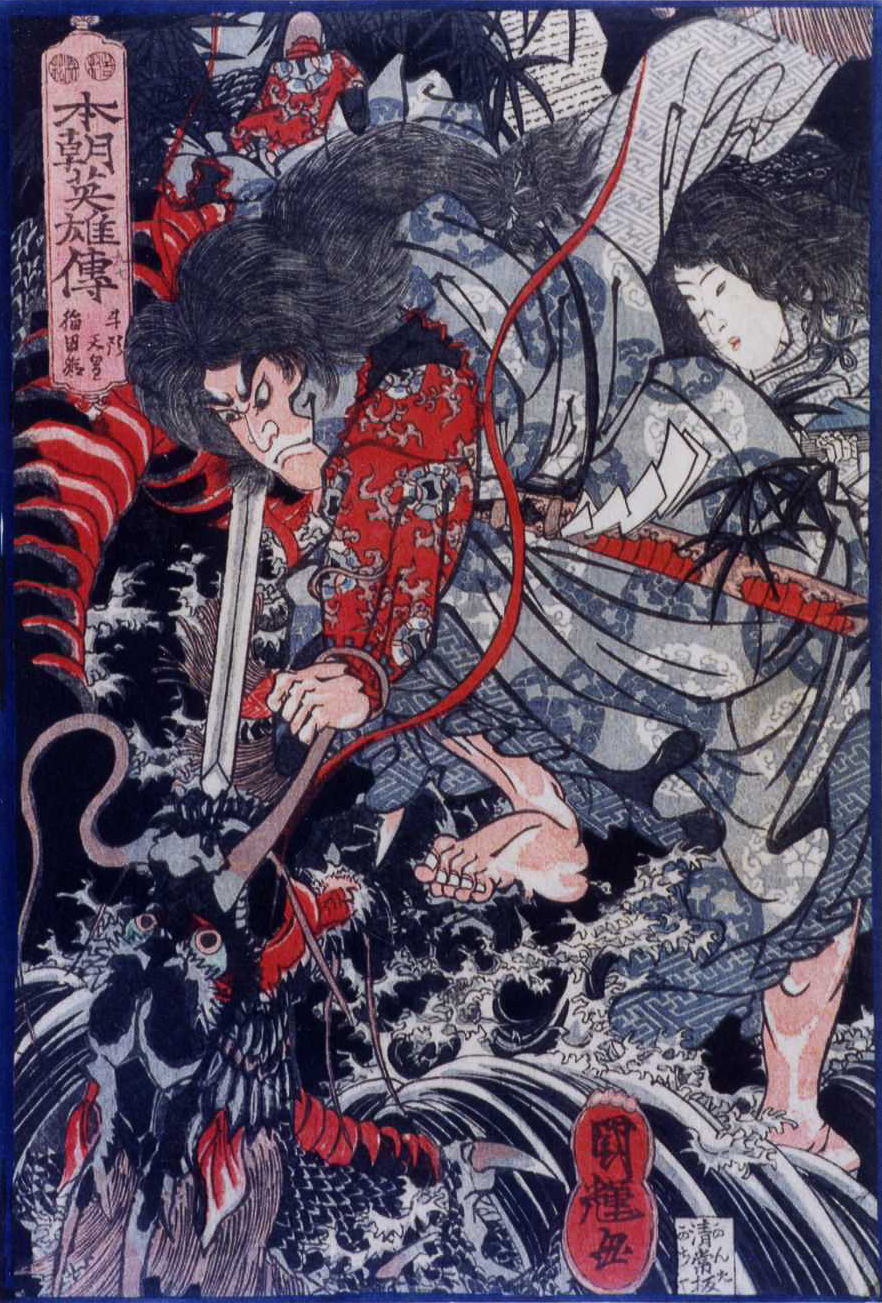
Kuniteru's print represents a scene from the Kabuki play Nihon Furisode Hajime, in which Emperor Gozu (posthumously deified as Susanoo-no-Mikoto) kills a dragon to save Princess Inada.

Utagawa Kuniteru (Japanese: 歌川国輝; active 1818–1860) was an ukiyo-e artist in the tradition of the Utagawa school. Born in Edo (Tokyo), he studied under both Kunisada and Toyokuni I. He produced prints of a wide variety of subjects, including many depicting the increasing Western influence on Japan, with his main output taking the form of book illustrations and single-sheet ukiyo-e.

He was known by various names: he called himself Kunitsuna II or Ichiransai until the Ganji era (1864/1865). Before 1844 he may also have been known as Sadashige and signed works using the name Ichiyusai.

As Kunitsuna II he concentrated on caricatures and scenes from his travels. After taking his master's name, he expanded his range to include scenes of sumo wrestling, and the modernization and westernization of Japan.

== Gallery ==
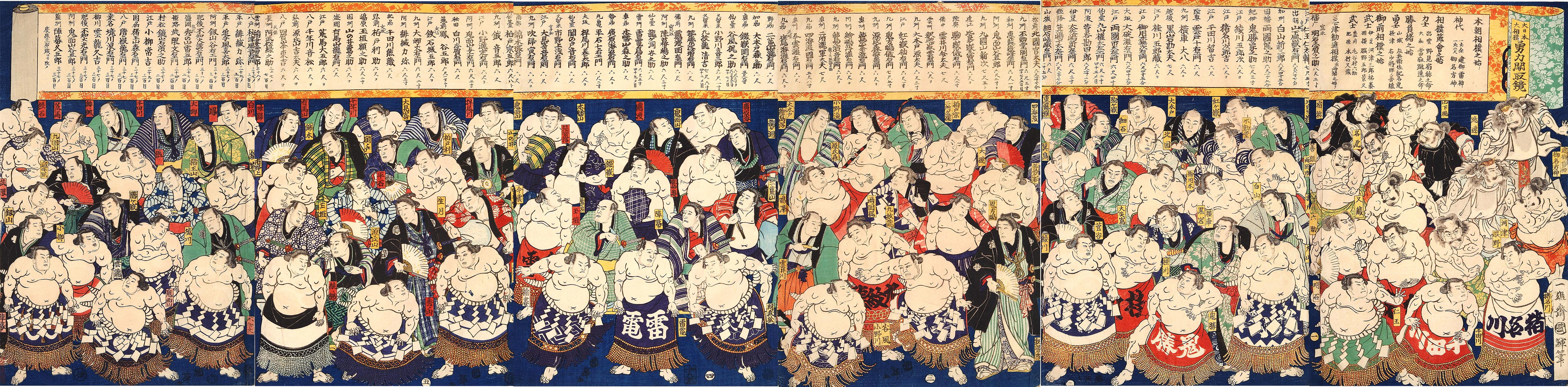
97 Rikishi of the Edo Period by Utagawa Kuniteru II

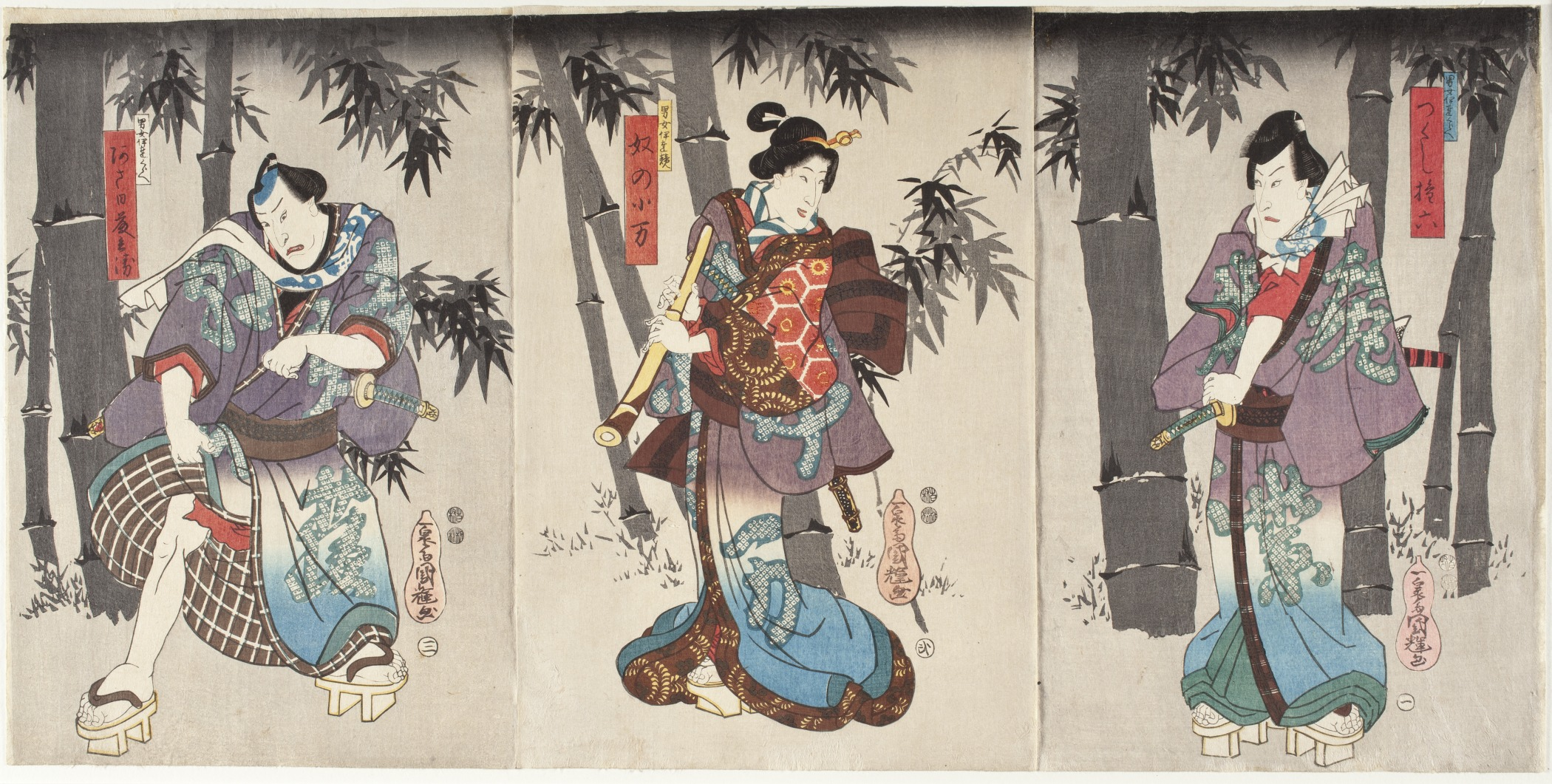
Tsukushi Jinroku by Utagawa Kuniteru
