= Utagawa Sadafusa =

Japanese ukiyo-e artist

Utagawa Sadafusa was an ukiyo-e artist from the Edo period.

Sadafusa was a disciple of Utagawa Kunisada, of Utagawa school, his style was similar to his teacher's. A lot of his works are in bijin-e genre (pictures of beautiful women), he also created images of kabuki actors, historical and mythic heroes, acrobats and game board prints. He worked between 1825 and 1850. He was from Edo, but later moved to Osaka and worked there.

Sadafusa also worked as a book illustrator for Iwatoya Kisaburō in 1829-30 and Moriya Jihei 1830-33 and 1835. Sadafusa is known to have had at least one notable pupil: Utagawa Fusatane, active from 1854 to 1889, who studied under both Kunisada and Sadafusa and whose bijinga reflect the drawing style of both masters.

== Gallery ==
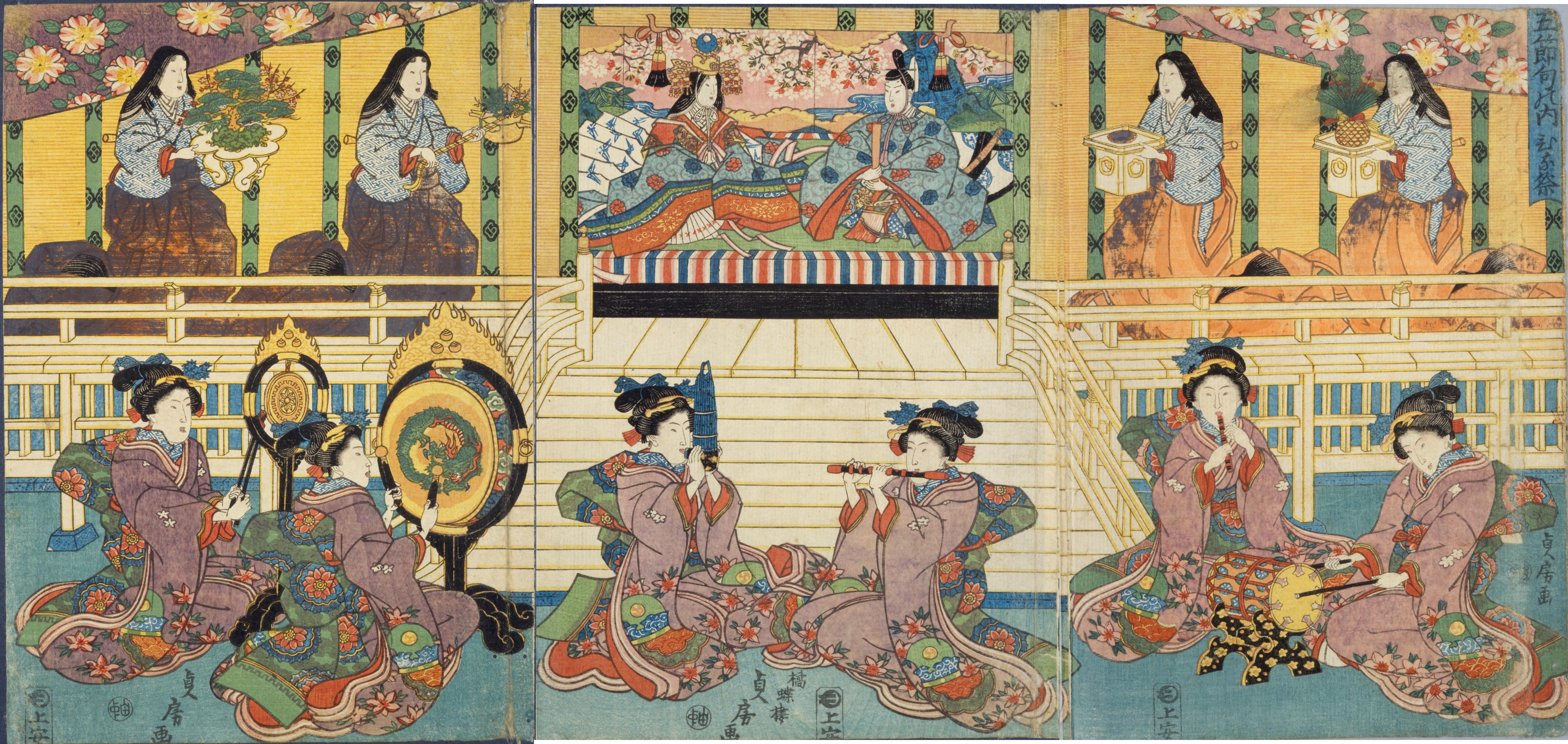
From the album "Chūgata Nishiki-e"

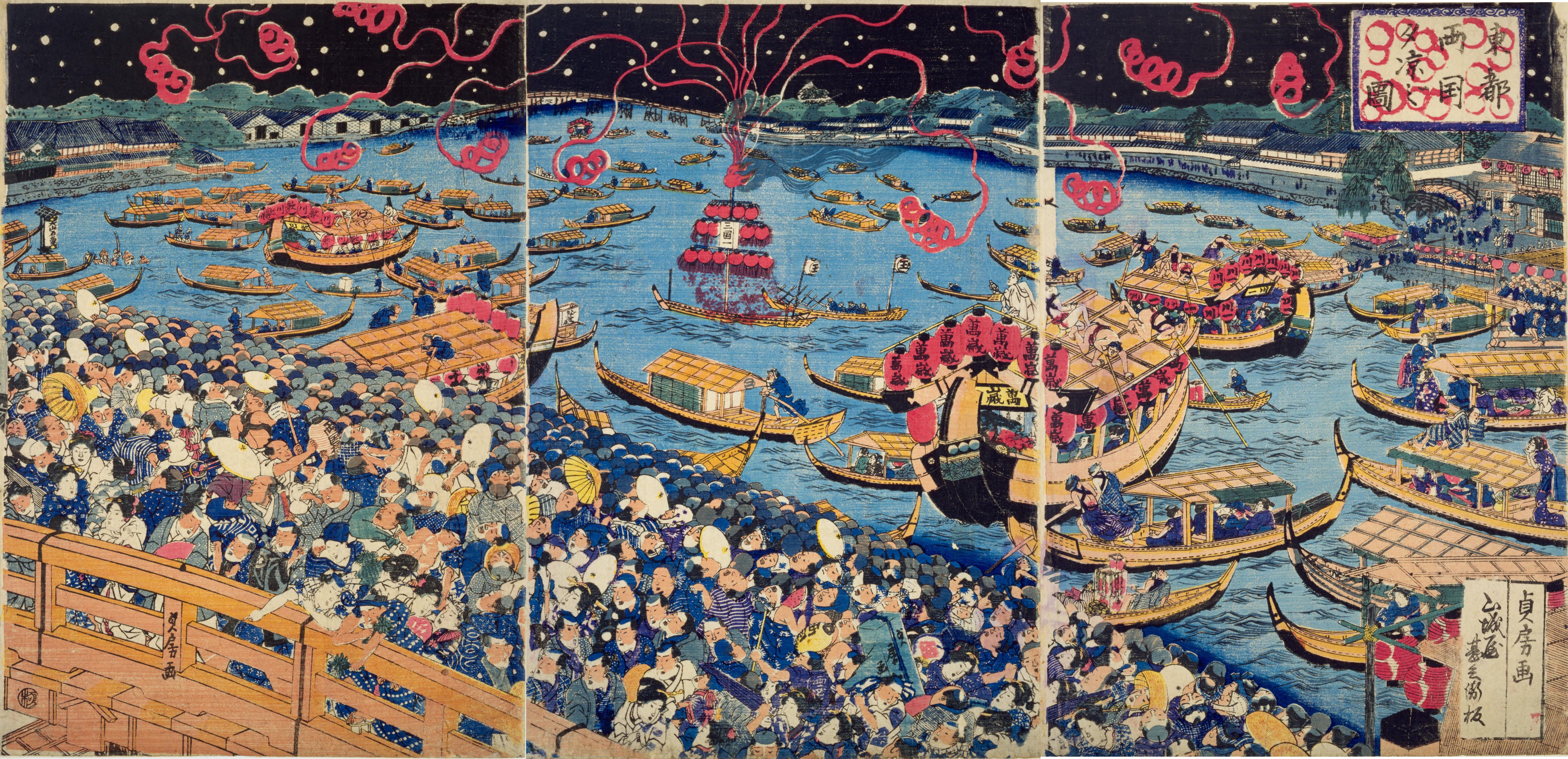
From the album "Nishiki-e"

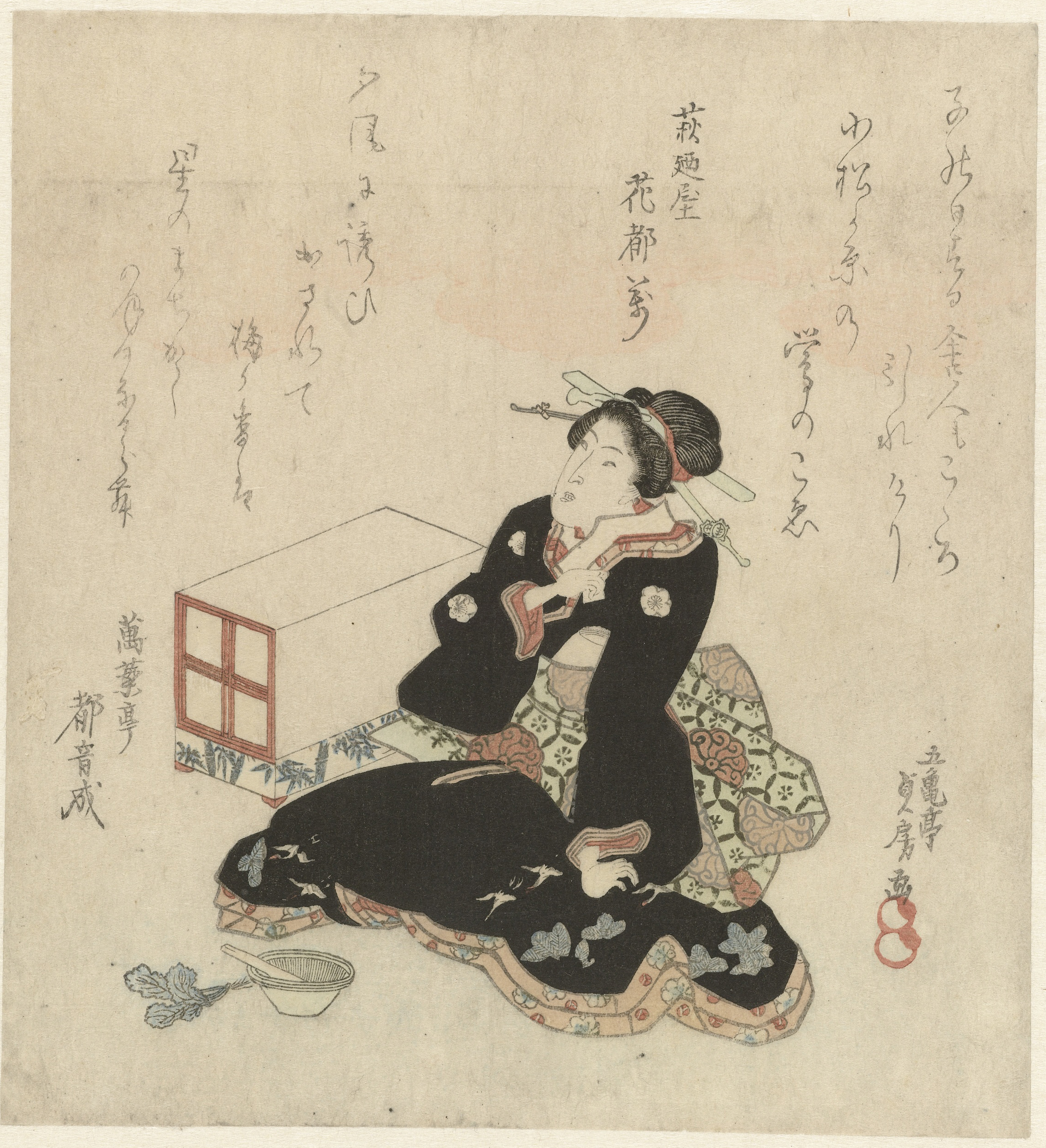
Seated woman in black kimono. Mentioned on the object: Utagawa Sadafusa, 1826–1829, color woodcut; line block in black with color blocks; metallic pigments
