= Utagawa Yoshifusa =

Japanese ukiyo-e artist

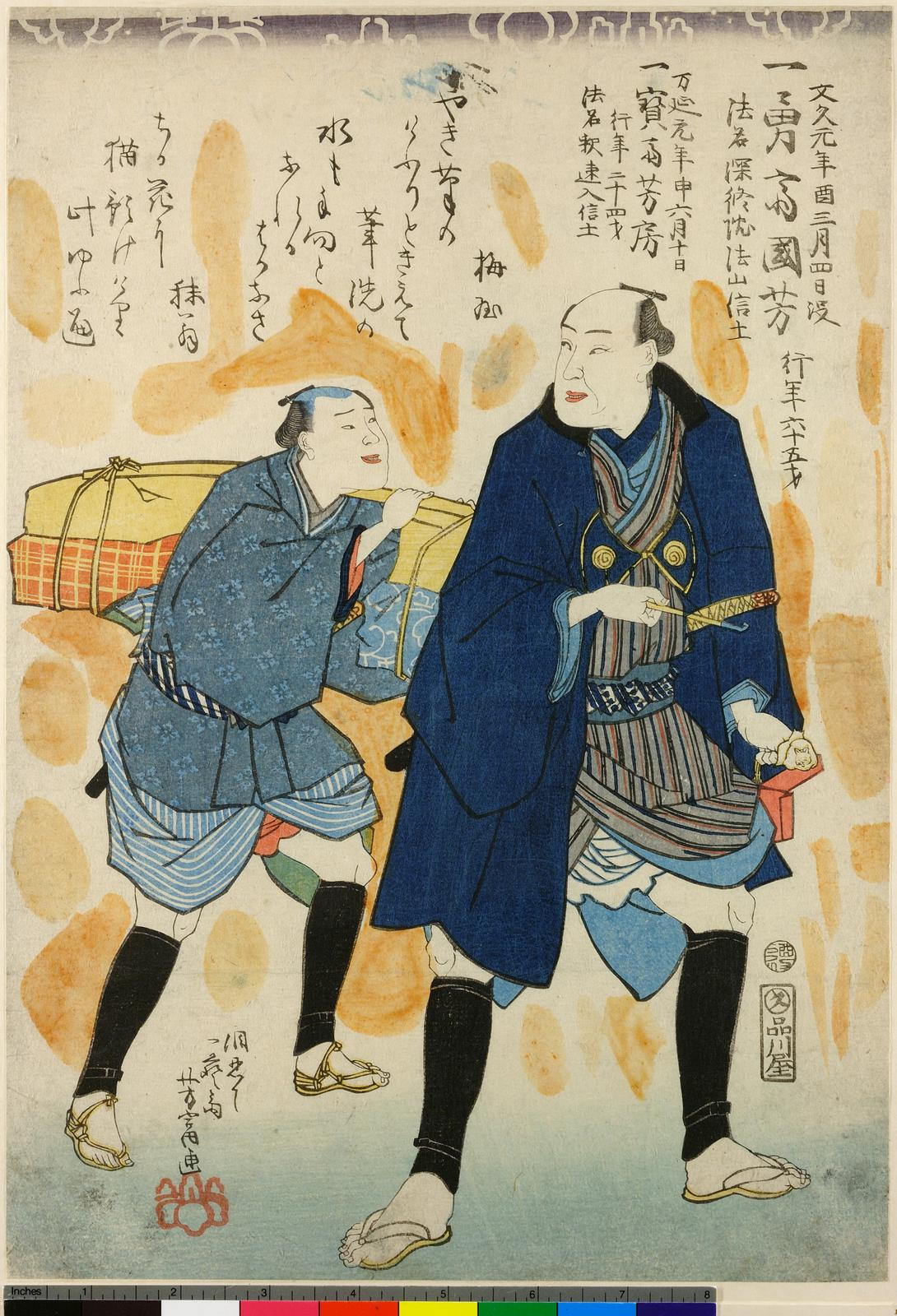
Utagawa Kuniyoshi and his pupil Ipposai Yoshifusa in travelling attire carrying personal effects. Print by Utagawa Yoshitomi.

Utagawa Yoshifusa (Japanese: 歌川芳房, 1837–1860), also known as Ipposai Yoshifusa (Japanese: 一宝斎), was a Japanese ukiyo-e master and a pupil of Utagawa Kuniyoshi of the Utagawa school.

His best known work is "Kiyomori’s Visit to Nunobiki Waterfall: The Ghost of Yoshihira Taking Revenge on Nanba" that depicts the ghost of the warrior Akugenta Yoshihira (1141–1160) taking revenge on his murderer Nanba Jirō and is based on the Tale of Heiji.

The Ghost of Yoshihira Taking Revenge on Nanba

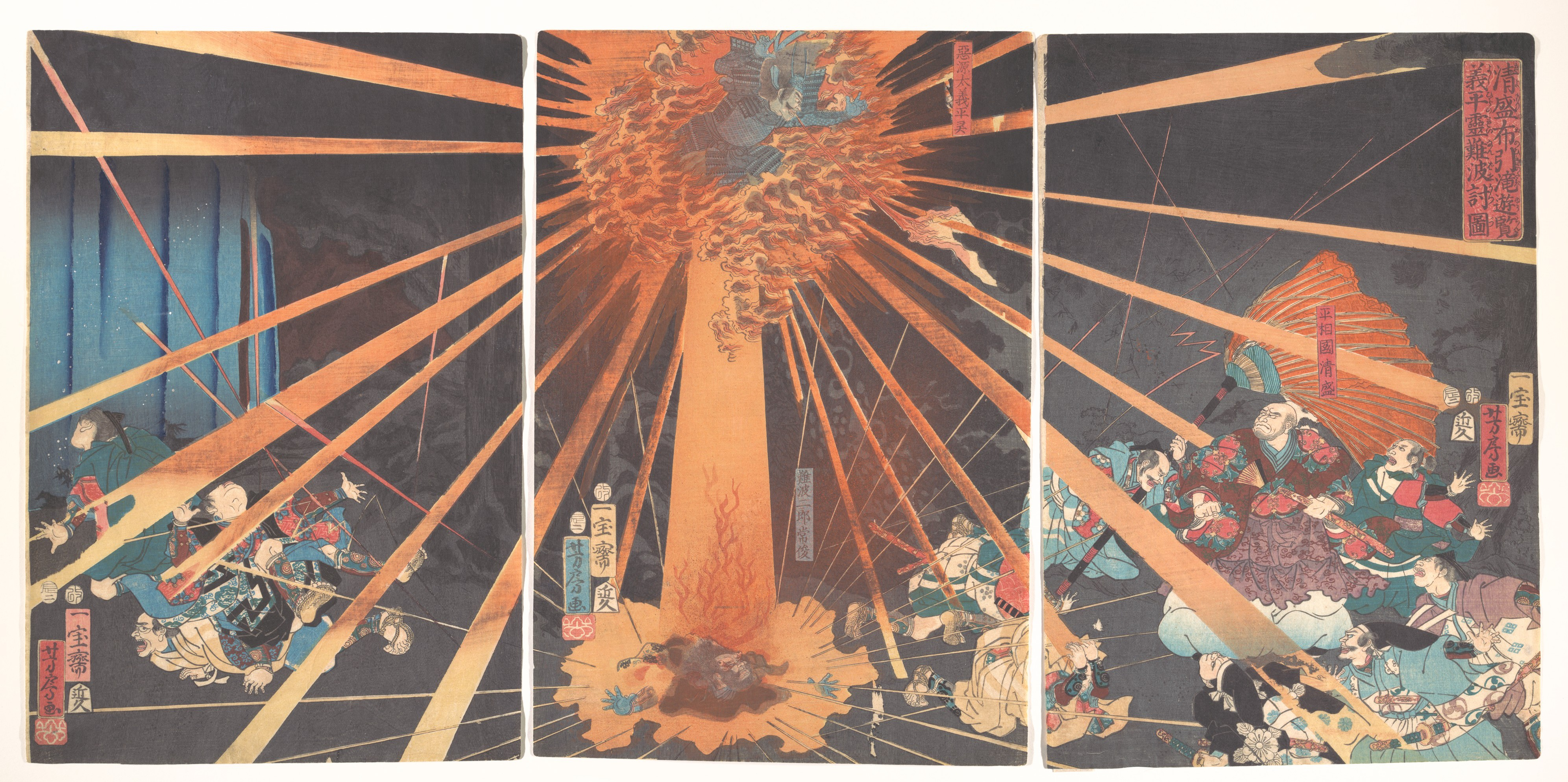

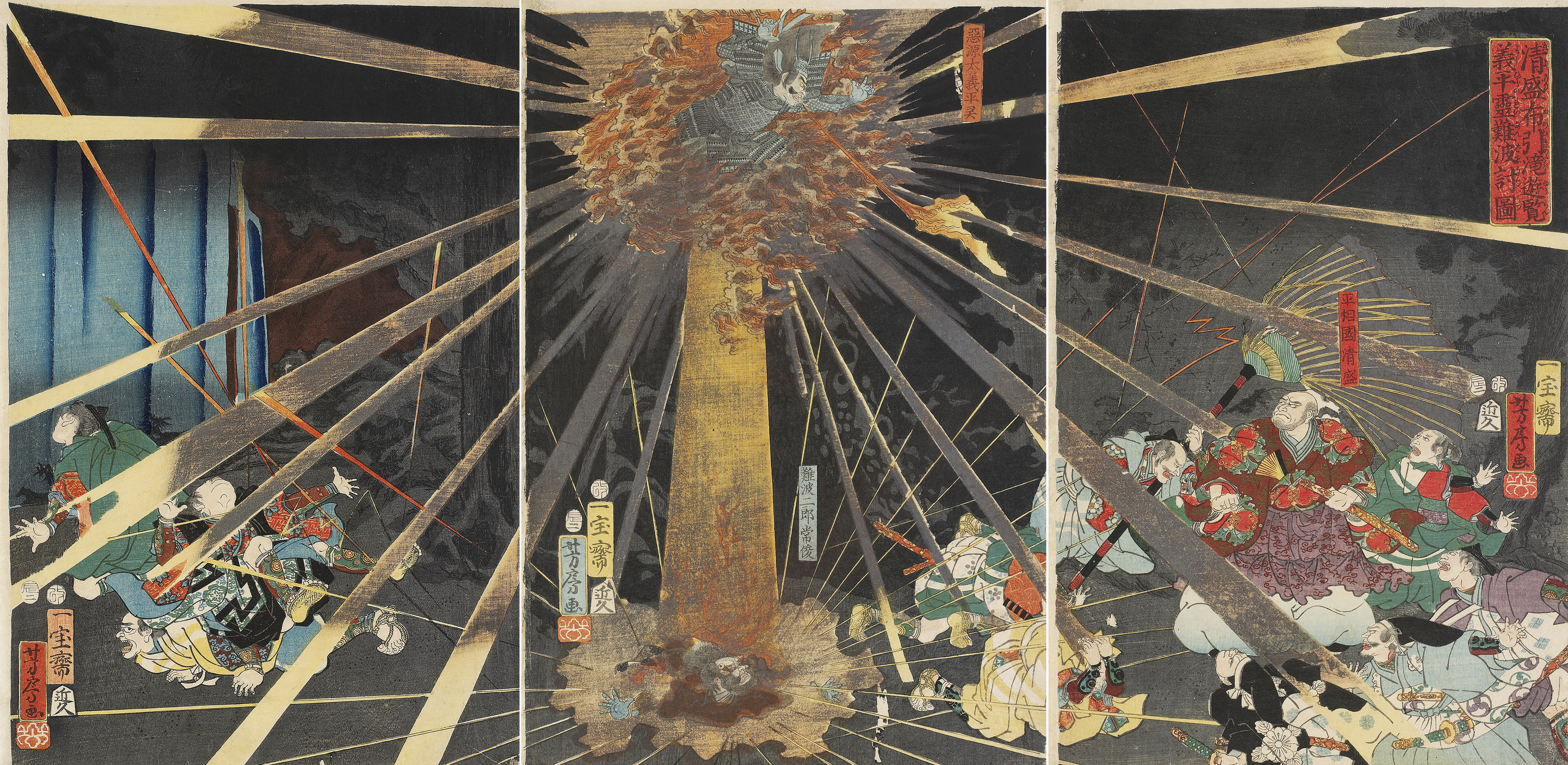
