= Toyoshige =

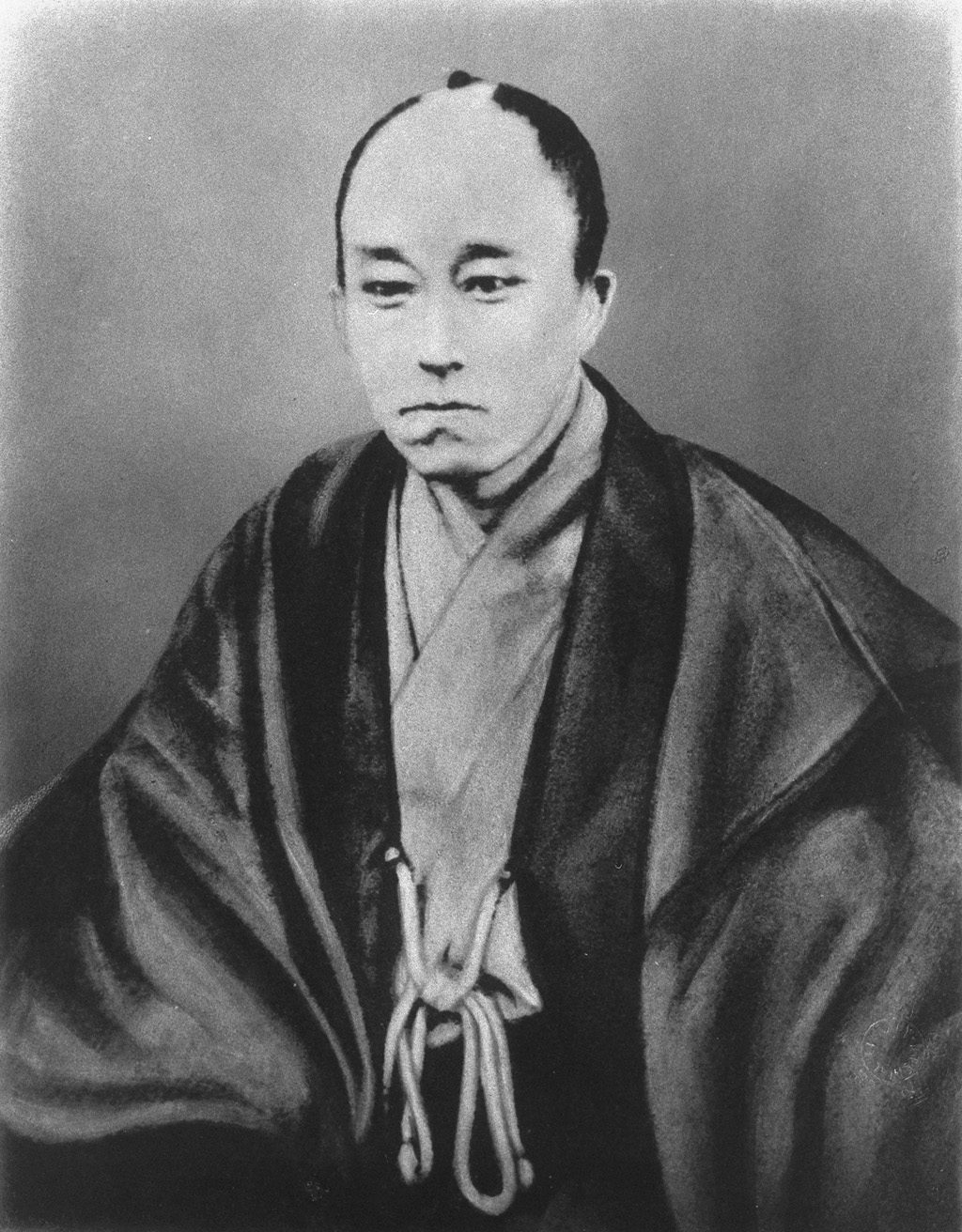
- Toyoshige Yamauchi (1827–1872), Japanese daimyō.
- Pronunciation: tojoɕige (IPA)
- Gender: Male

Origin
- Origin: Japanese
- Meaning: Different meanings depending on the kanji used

Other names
- Alternative spelling: Toyosige (Kunrei-shiki) Toyosige (Nihon-shiki) Toyoshige (Hepburn)

Toyoshige is a masculine Japanese given name.

== Written forms ==
Toyoshige can be written using different combinations of kanji characters. Here are some examples:

- 豊重, "bountiful, heavy"
- 豊茂, "bountiful, luxuriant"
- 豊繁, "bountiful, prosperous/complexity"
- 登代重, "climb up, generation, heavy"

The name can also be written in hiragana とよしげ or katakana トヨシゲ.

== Notable people with the name ==
- Utagawa Toyoshige (歌川 豊重, 1777–1835) a Japanese ukiyo-e artist also known as Toyokuni II (二代目 歌川 豊国).
- Toyoshige Yamauchi (山内 豊信; 1827–1872), a Japanese daimyō.
