= Utagawa Toyokuni =

Japanese artist (1769–1825)

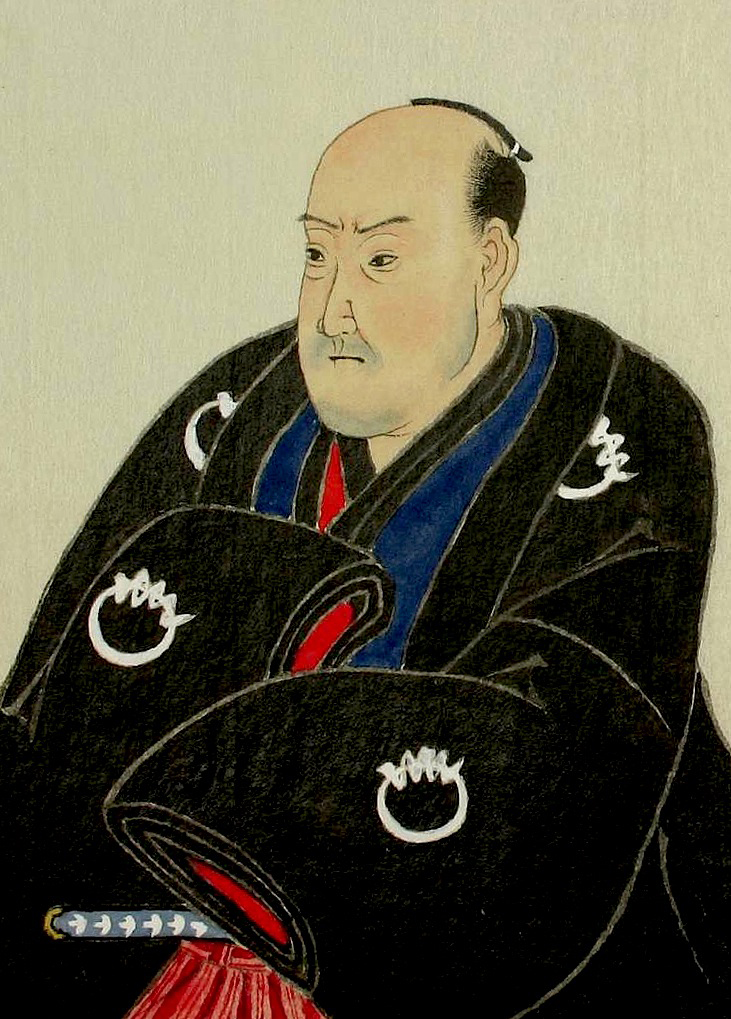
Toyokuni Utagawa by Kunisada

Utagawa Toyokuni (Note: Japanese pronunciation: [ɯ̈̀.tä́.ɡä́.β̞ä́ | tò̞.jó̞.kɯ̈̀.ɲ̟ì, -β̞ä́ tó̞-, -kɯ̈́.ɲ̟í, -ŋä́-]) (歌川 豊国; 1769 – 24 February 1825), also often referred to as Toyokuni I, to distinguish him from the members of his school who took over his gō (art-name) after he died, was a great master of ukiyo-e, known in particular for his kabuki actor prints. He was the second head of the renowned Utagawa school of Japanese woodblock artists, and was the artist who elevated it to the position of great fame and power it occupied for the rest of the nineteenth century.

== Biography ==
Toyokuni was born in 1769, the son of Kurahashi Gorobei, a carver of dolls and puppets, including replicas of kabuki actors. At around 14, Toyokuni was apprenticed to the first head of the Utagawa house, Utagawa Toyoharu, whom his father knew well and who lived nearby. One of his fellow pupils under Toyoharu was Toyohiro, whose pupil was the great landscape artist Hiroshige. In recognition of his artistic ability, Toyokuni later took the name Utagawa Toyokuni, following the common practice of using one syllable of his master's name.

Toyokuni seems to have studied intently those who came before him, particularly Utamaro, Chōbunsai Eishi and Eishōsai Chōki, and produced first a mastery, and then a synthesis of their styles, to create a style of his own.

He was known mostly for his prints related to the kabuki theatre, in particular his yakusha-e actor portraits, a field which he took to new heights. He also, however, produced other genres such as musha-e warrior prints, shunga erotica, and most notably bijin-ga.

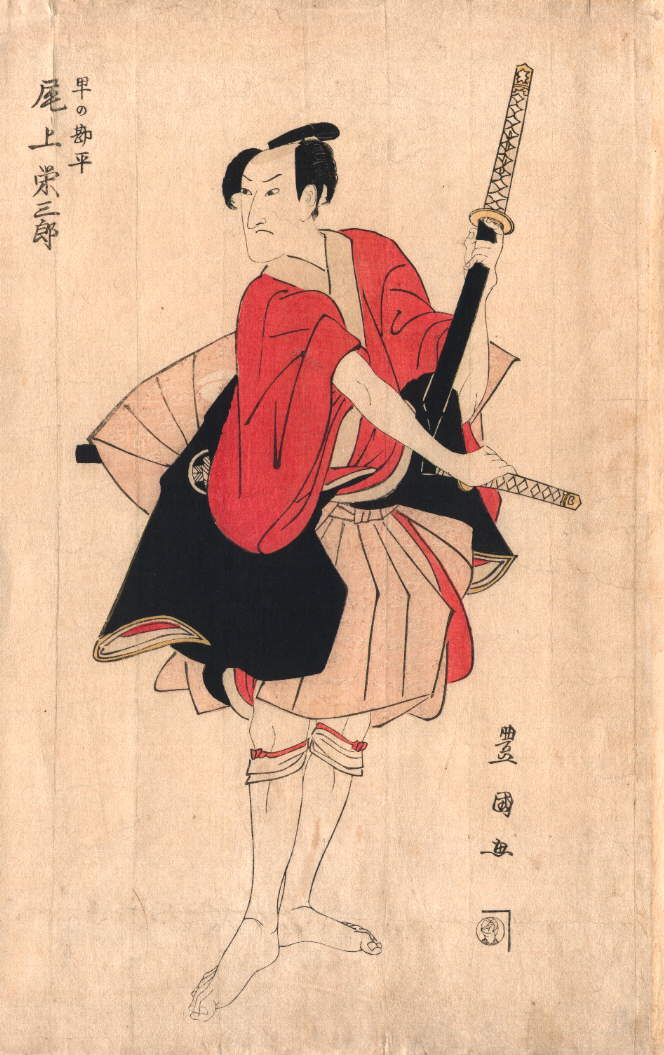
Onoe Eisaburo I, c. 1800

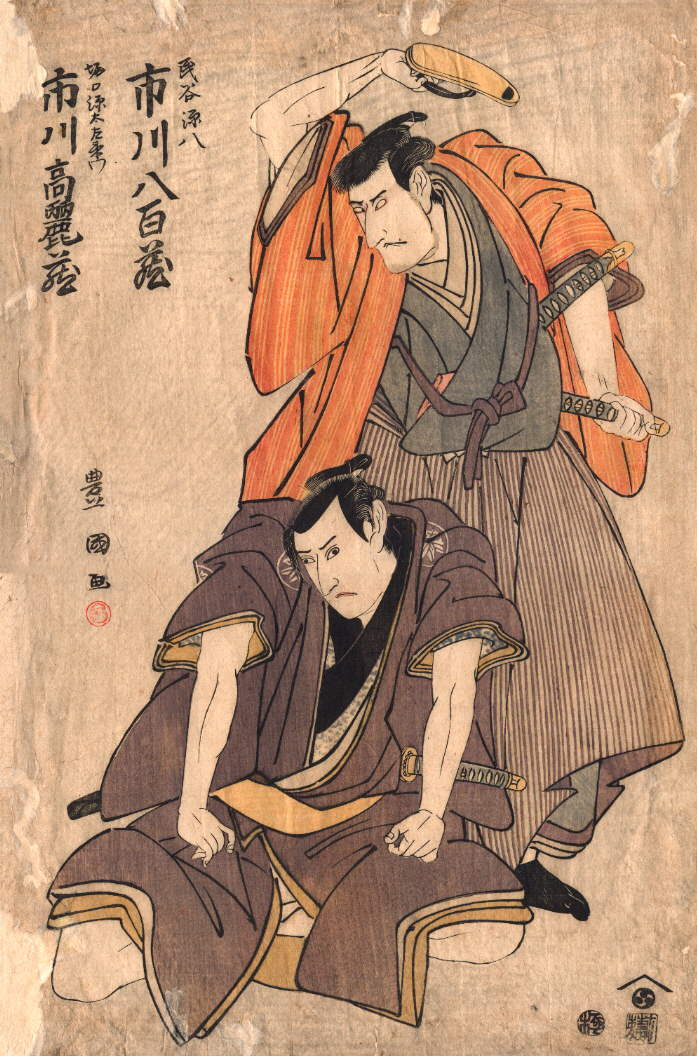
Ichikawa Komazo and Ichikawa Yaozo; circa 1800

Among Toyokuni's most significant achievements in this field was the series Yakusha butai no sugata-e ("Actors on Stage"), comprising more than fifty multicoloured prints of full-length actor portraits published from 1794 by the Edo publisher Izumiya Ichibei; the series predates the celebrated actor portraits produced by Sharaku, whose own work in the genre began in May 1794. Over the course of his career Toyokuni produced close to three thousand woodblock prints, including more than ninety print series.

In his actor prints, like Sharaku, one sees the real subject; but his prints merely portrayed what he saw, unlike Sharaku who exaggerated those aspects he saw as the most key. It is said of Toyokuni's prints that they recreate exactly what one would see on stage; they show actors acting, not merely just pictures of actors. Together, these characteristics made Toyokuni's prints far more popular among theatre-goers than Sharaku's, although history has come to judge Sharaku the keener observer and greater artist.

His popularity and prolific output may in part have been his undoing, though. From 1803 through 1817, his work became more static, even as it became more popular. He continued to produce large quantities of prints, but the quality as a rule did not match that of his earlier days. Occasional prints from this period, however, show his old brilliance.

He died in Edo in 1825, surrounded by many of his pupils.

== Names ==
Like most Edo period Japanese artists, Toyokuni was known by several names throughout his lifetime, some sequentially and some concurrently.

- Family name (姓 - sei): Kurahashi (倉橋)
- Childhood name (幼名 - yōmyō): Kumakichi (熊吉)
- Nickname (通称 - tsūshō): Kumaemon (熊右衛門)
- Art names (号 - gō): Utagawa Toyokuni (歌川豊国), Utagawa Ichiyōsai (歌川 一陽斎), Ichiyōsai Toyokuni (一陽斎 豊国)
- Posthumous Buddhist name (戒名 - kaimyō / 法名 - hōmyō): Tokumyōin Jissaireigō Shinji

In addition, the name 'Toyokuni' has been transcribed through several kanji character combinations, both by the artist himself and by those writing about him.

- Characters used to write Toyokuni: 豊国, 豊國, 豊圀, 豐國, 豐圀

Today, Toyokuni is almost universally written using the characters 豊国. Each of the other kanji are no longer in common usage.

== Pupils ==
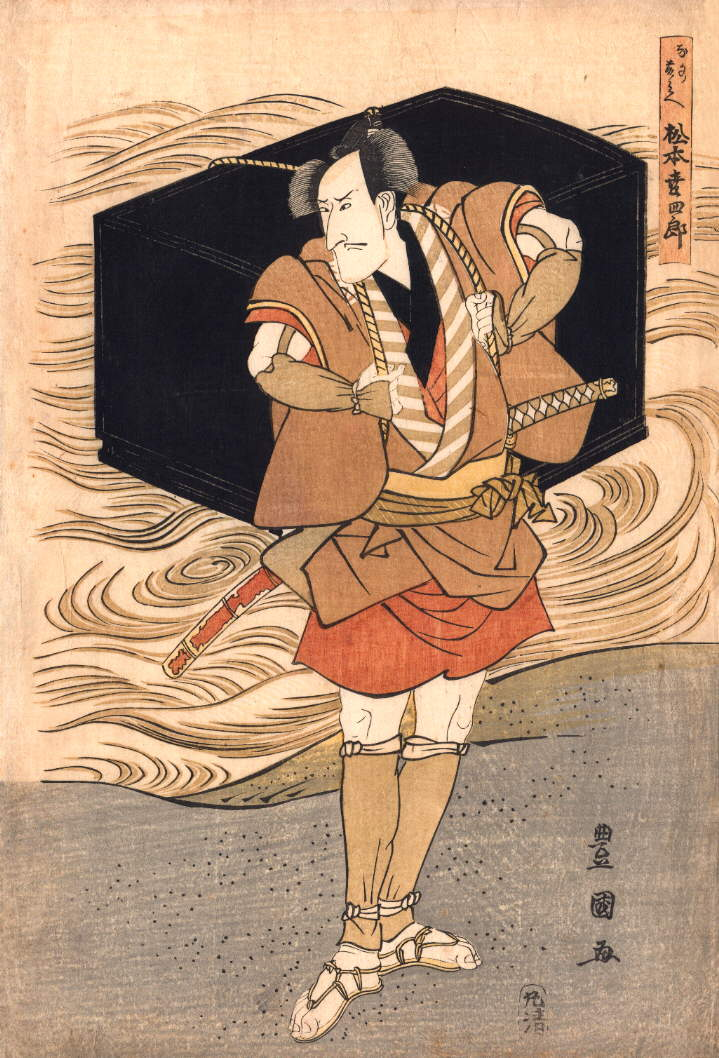
Matsumoto Koshiro V; circa 1800s

Toyokuni's two major pupils were the woodblock print masters Kunisada and Kuniyoshi, but he had a host of students in his school. Indeed, so powerful was the Utagawa school after Toyokuni's time that almost every Japanese print artist of note either had one of these two characters in his gō, or, like Yoshitoshi, was a student of one who did.

His gō, "Toyokuni", was initially used after his death by his son-in-law, Toyoshige, who is therefore known to us as Toyokuni II. Thereafter, it was handed down and used by each head of the Utagawa school in turn. Kunisada is thus also known as Toyokuni III.

== Retrospective observations ==
Evaluations of Toyokuni as an artist are somewhat mixed. Indeed, he himself is reported to have once said:

"My pictures – they are merely something that I draw, and nothing more than that!"

The main criticisms of his works relate to his "predominantly imitative" style, and to the "marked decline" in the quality of works from later in his career. However, Toyokuni's style is admired for characteristics such as "decorative bombast", and "bold, taut designs". He is also credited with such innovations as diptych, triptych and polyptych formats, and with training future masters of ukiyo-e. His work captured the world around him, particularly the kabuki theatre, with great clarity, and his style was a step forward. In addition, it was commercially successful, and thus freed woodblock prints from many of the restrictive canons which had limited previous generations of artists.

== Print series ==
Here is a very incomplete list of his print series, with dates:

- Views of Actors on Stage (ca. 1793)
- Sketches of Seven Elegant Paragons of Beauty (ca. 1800)
- Views of Elegant Geisha in Characteristic Poses (ca. 1801)
- Tomimoto the Geisha (ca. 1830–1844)

== Collections and museums ==
- Udinotti Museum of Figurative Art

== Gallery ==
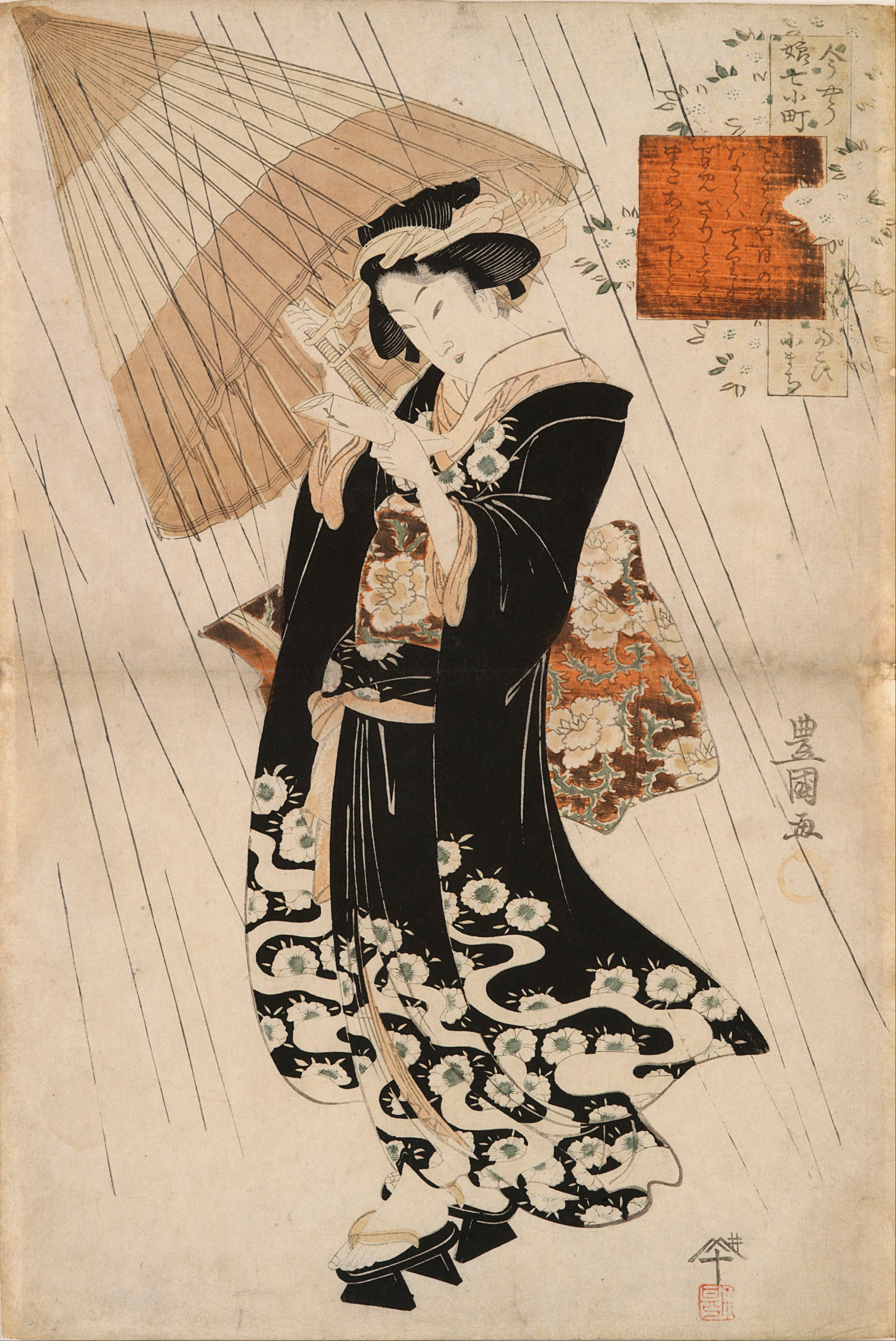
The poet Ono-no Komachi in the rain

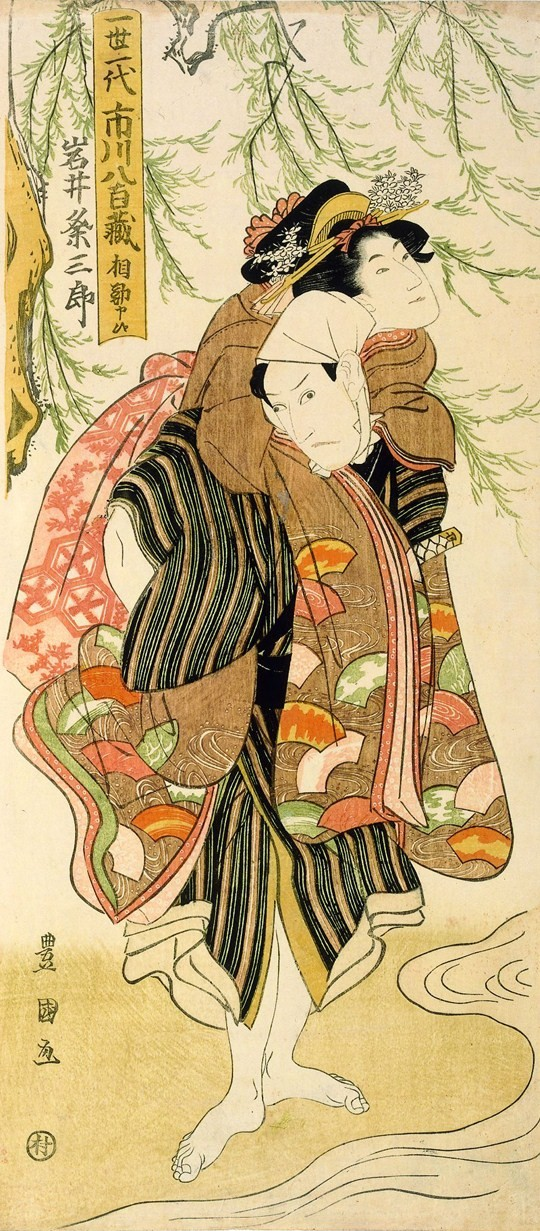
Kabuki actors, ca. 1800

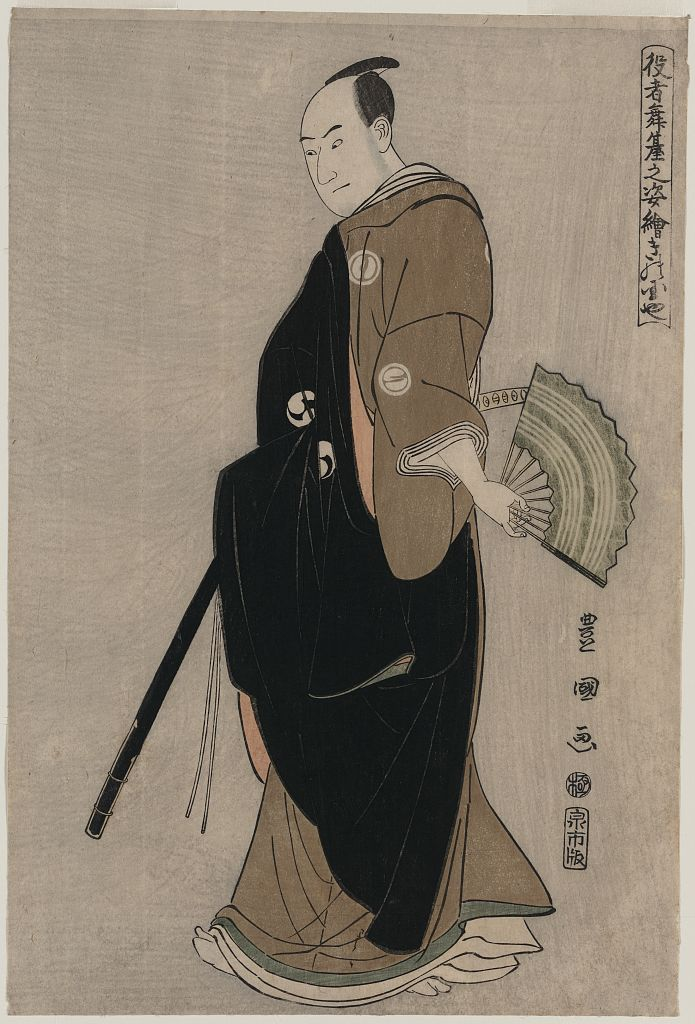
Kinokuniya Sawamura Sojuro III as Ogishi Kurando, 1794

== See also ==
- List of Utagawa school members
- Ichikawa Omezō as a Pilgrim and Ichikawa Yaozō as a Samurai (Toyokuni I)
