= Utagawa Toyokuni II =

Japanese ukiyo-e designer

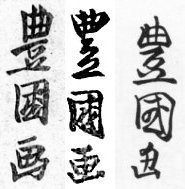
"Toyokuni ga" (豊国画) signatures of (from left to right) Toyokuni I, Toyokuni II (Toyoshige) and Toyokuni III (Kunisada)

Utagawa Toyokuni II (1777–1835), also known as Toyoshige, was a designer of ukiyo-e Japanese woodblock prints in Edo. He was also known as Gosotei Toyokuni or Hongo Toyokuni, the latter in reference to the district of Edo in which he lived, and over his career he also used the gō Ichibetsusai, Ichiesai and Ichiryūsai. He was the pupil, son-in-law and adopted son of Toyokuni I. The former used the name Toyoshige (豊重) until 1826, the year after his teacher's death, when the family gave him the right to use his teacher's name and he began signing his work Toyokuni (豊国). In 1835 he died, and in 1844 the family persuaded Kunisada, the most famous student of Toyokuni I, to use the name "Toyokuni" and become leader of the school. Although Kunisada never recognised Toyoshige's right to the name Toyokuni, nevertheless Kunisada after 1844 is always referred to as Toyokuni III.

Toyoshige's earliest known works date to 1823; he is remembered for his yakusha-e and bijinga, as well as his illustrations for gōkan. In the early 1830s he produced fine fūkeiga landscape prints, strongly inspired by Hokuju and Hokusai, and also created some paintings.

Toyokuni I, Toyokuni II (Toyoshige), and Toyokuni III (Kunisada) each used the signature Toyokuni (豊国). The signature of Toyokuni II is easiest to distinguish by the chalice-shaped 'zig-zag' toyo (豊) kanji (see figure). This form was, however, also employed by Toyokuni I in his later years, as well as by Kunisada prior to 1845 when he formally inherited the Toyokuni name. Kunisada's use of this form is evidenced in a number of sumo prints dating from the late 1830s to mid 1840s (i.e. after Toyoshige deceased). This has led to some debate over whether all prints signed with the chalice/zig-zag form can definitely be attributed to Toyoshige and the validity of such claims made by Succo in 1913, but ultimately remains unresolved.

Toyoshige's students include Utagawa Kunimatsu, Utagawa Kunishige II, Utagawa Kuniteru III, and Utagawa Kunitsuru I. Kunimatsu, born Wada Kunijirō, was the third son of Kunitsuru I and the younger brother of Kunitsuru II.

== Legacy ==
Works by Utagawa Toyokuni II are held in the Library of Congress, including the work The Sumo Wrestler Kagamiiwa of the West Side.

== Gallery ==
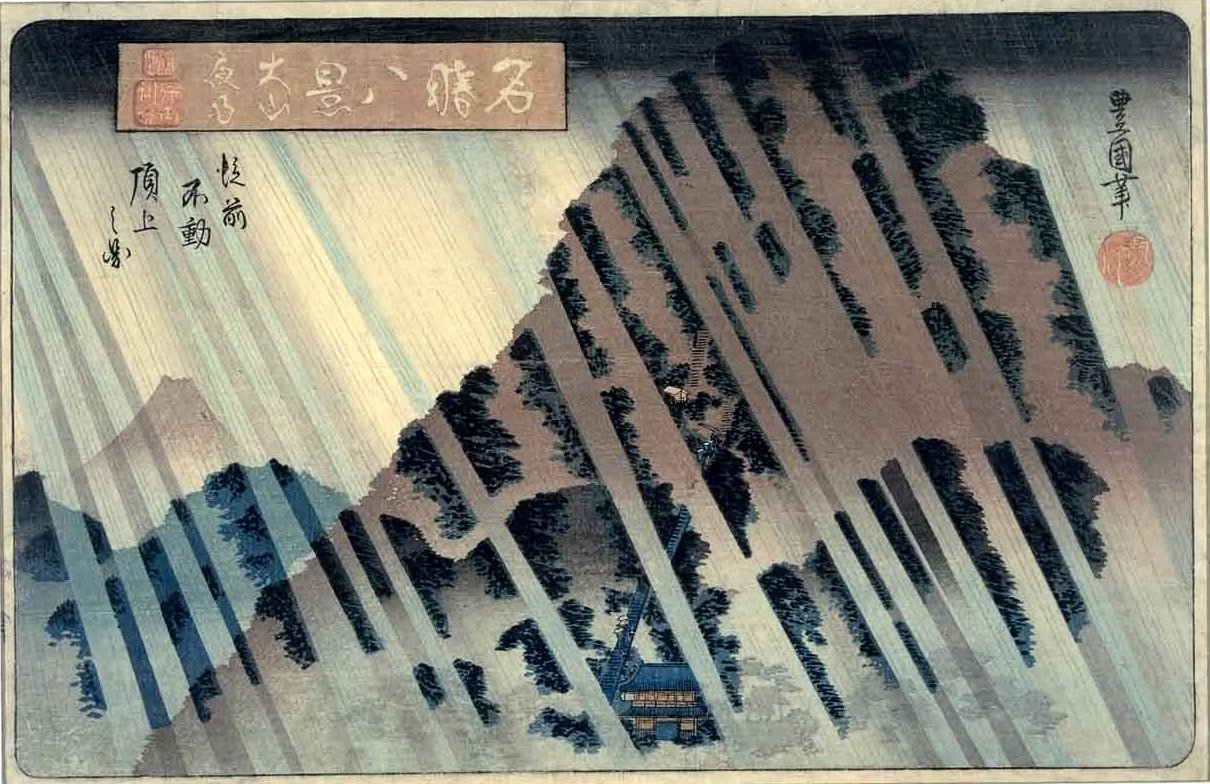
Eight Famous Views (Meisho Hakkei), Night Rain at Oyama (Maya Mountain), a woodblock print by Toyokuni II

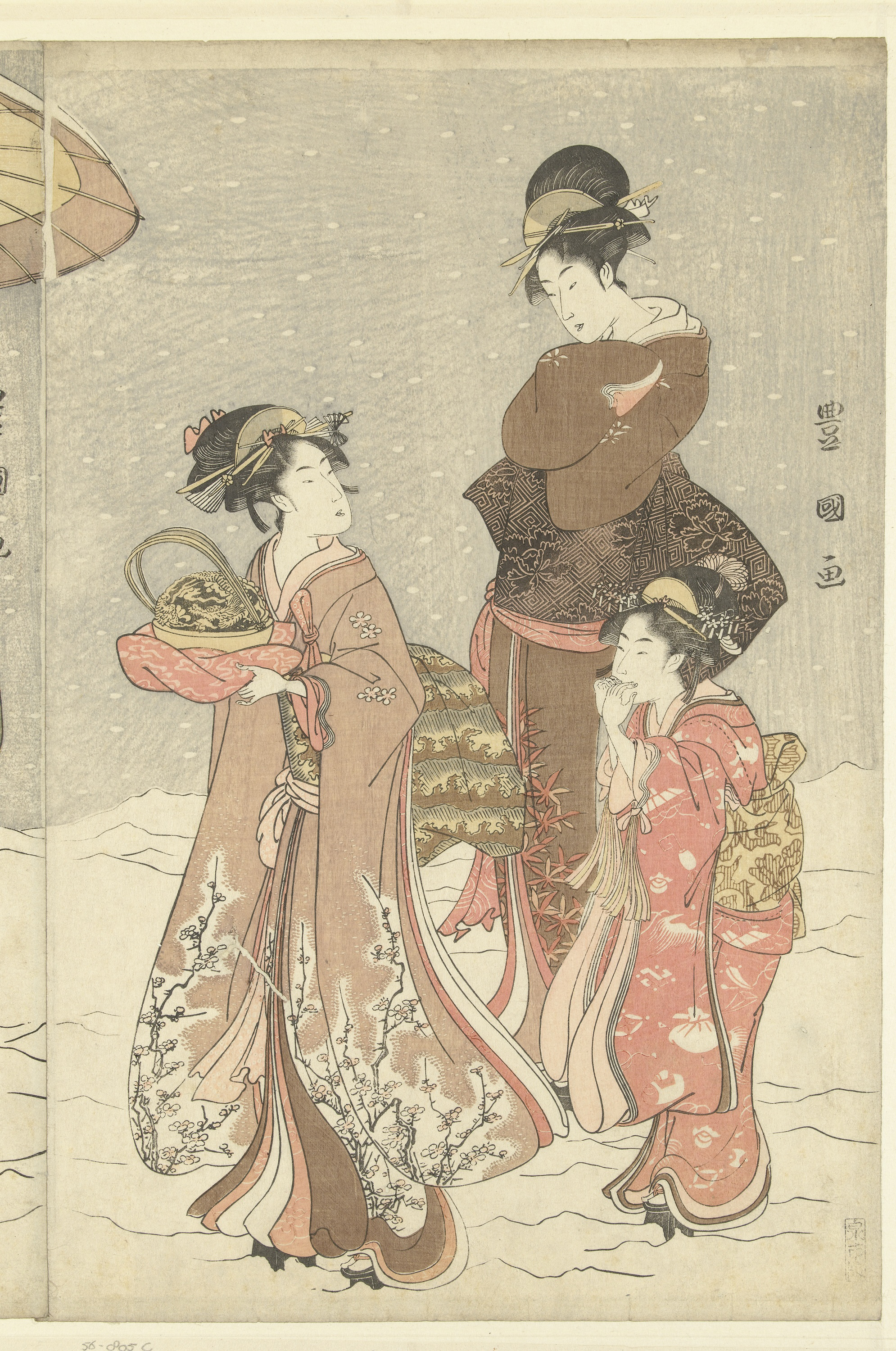

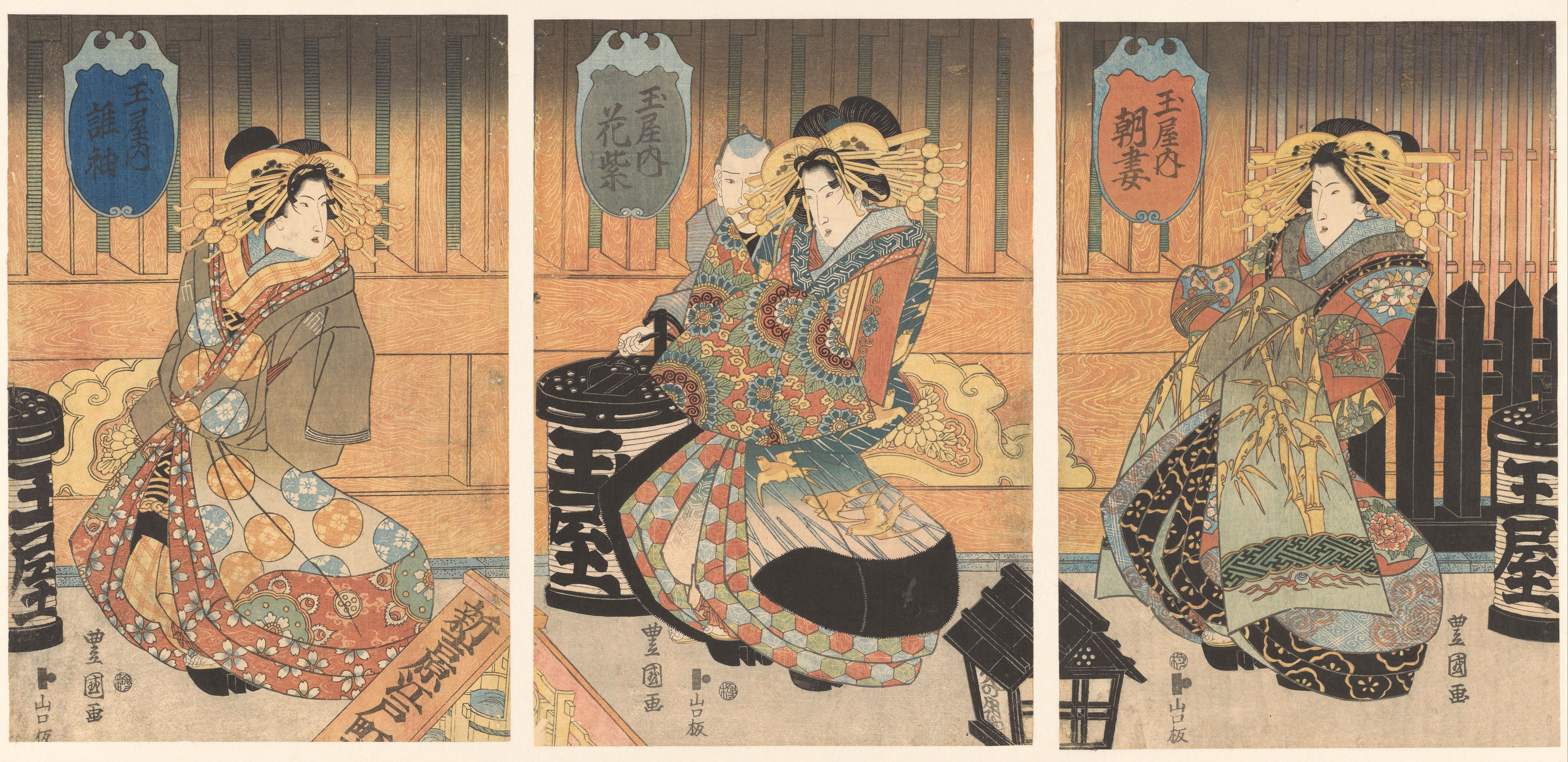
Three courtesans from the Tamaya house, c. 1828
