= List of painters by name beginning with "U" =

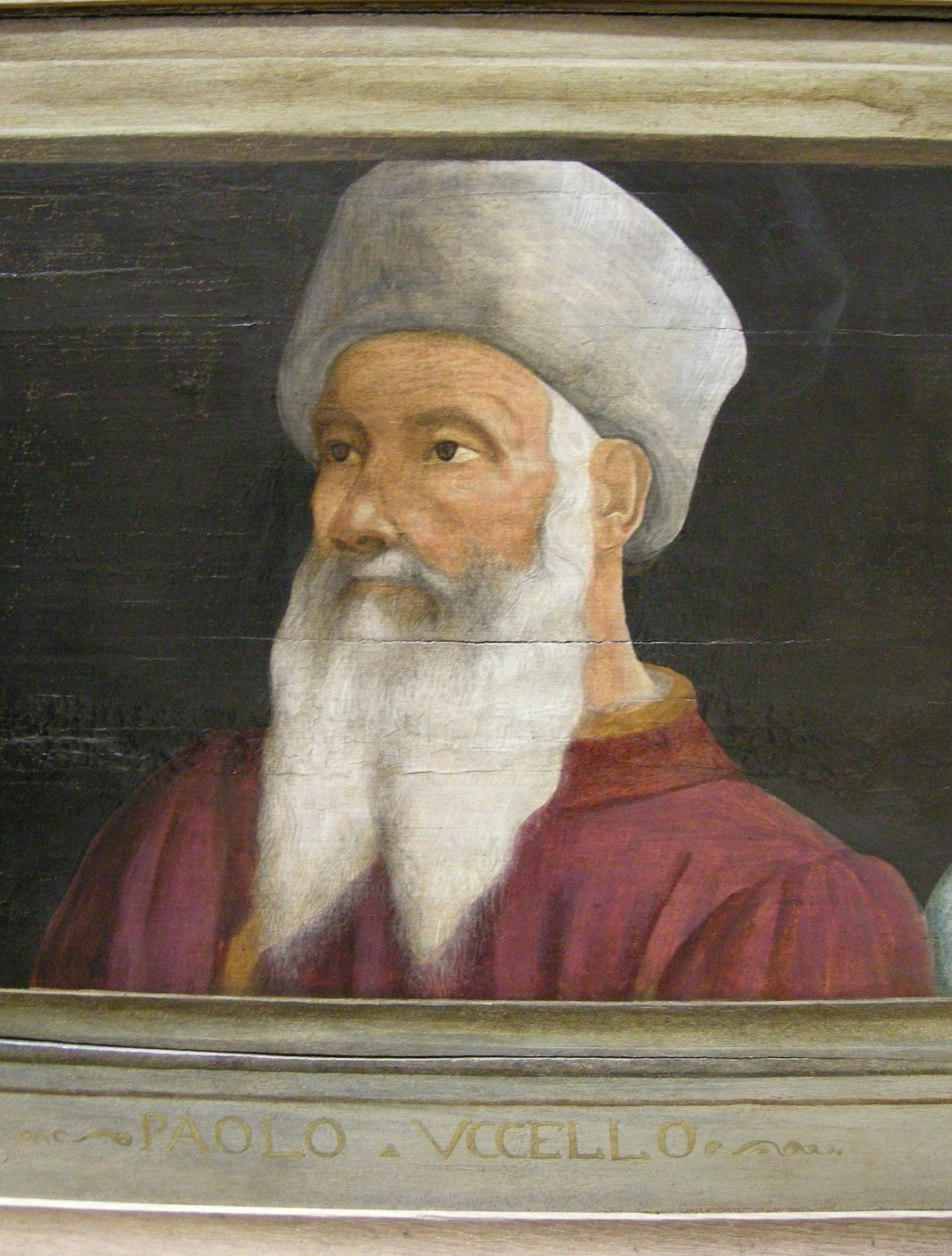
Paolo Uccello

Please add names of notable painters with a Wikipedia page, in precise English alphabetical order, using U.S. spelling conventions. Country and regional names refer to where painters worked for long periods, not to personal allegiances.

- Raoul Ubac (1910–1985), French painter, sculptor and engraver
- Paolo Uccello (1397–1475), Italian painter noted for pioneering work on visual perspective in art
- Aguri Uchida (内田あぐり, born 1949), Japanese nihonga painter
- Géza Udvary (1872–1932), Hungarian painter
- Uemura Shōen (上村 松園, 1875–1949), Japanese painter
- Euan Uglow (1932–2000), English painter
- Fritz von Uhde (1848–1911), German painter
- Jacob van der Ulft (1621–1689), Dutch painter, print-maker and architect
- Ryuzaburo Umehara (梅原龍三郎, 1888–1986), Japanese painter
- Unkoku Togan (梅原龍三郎, 1547–1618), Japanese painter
- Michelangelo Unterberger (1695–1753), Austro-Hungarian (Tyrolean) painter
- Uragami Gyokudō (浦上玉堂, 1745–1820), Japanese painter, calligrapher and musician
- Modest Urgell (1839–1919), Spanish painter, illustrator and playwright
- Federico Uribe (born 1962), Colombian/American artist
- Jenaro de Urrutia Olaran (1893–1965), Spanish painter and muralist
- Lesser Ury (1861–1931), German painter and print-maker
- Simon Ushakov (1626–1686), Russian graphic artist
- Utagawa Hirokage (歌川広景, fl 1855–1865), Japanese ukiyo-e woodblock designer
- Utagawa Hiroshige II (二代目歌川広重, 1829–1869), Japanese ukiyo-e designer
- Utagawa Kunimasa (歌川国政, 1773–1810), Japanese ukiyo-e designer
- Utagawa Kunimasu (歌川国升, fl. 17th, 18th or 19th c.), Japanese kamigata-e print designer
- Utagawa Kunisada (歌川国貞,1786–1865), Japanese ukiyo-e woodblock designer
- Utagawa Kunisada II (歌川国貞, 1823–1880), Japanese ukiyo-e print designer
- Utagawa Kunisada III (歌川国貞, 1848–1920), Japanese ukiyo-e print-maker
- Utagawa Kuniyoshi (歌川國芳, 1797–1861), Japanese ukiyo-e woodblock print-maker and painter
- Utagawa Toyoharu (歌川豊春, 1735–1814), Japanese ukiyo-e artist
- Utagawa Toyokuni (歌川豊国, 1769–1825), Japanese ukiyo-e print-maker
- Utagawa Yoshiiku (歌川芳幾, 1833–1904), Japanese artist
- Utagawa Yoshitaki (歌川芳滝, 1841–1899), Japanese ukiyo-e woodblock print designer
- Utagawa Yoshitora (歌川芳虎, fl. 1850–1850), Japanese ukiyo-e woodblock print designer and illustrator
- Utagawa Yoshitsuya (歌川芳艶, 1822–1866), Japanese ukiyo-e woodblock print designer
- Jacob van Utrecht (1479–after 1525), Flemish/German painter and Protestant Reformation figure
- Maurice Utrillo (1883–1955), French painter
- Moses van Uyttenbroeck (1600–1646), Dutch painter and etcher
- Dechko Uzunov (1899–1986), Bulgarian painter
- Charles Uzzell-Edwards (born 1968), Welsh graffiti artist
