= Yokohama-e =

Japanese woodblock prints depicting foreigners and scenes of the port city of Yokohama

Yokohama-e (横浜絵, "Yokohama pictures") are Japanese woodblock prints depicting non–East Asian foreigners and scenes in the port city of Yokohama.

== History ==
The port of Yokohama was opened to foreigners in 1859, and ukiyo-e artists, primarily of the Utagawa school, produced more than 800 different woodblock prints in response to a general curiosity about these strangers. The earliest known depictions of the genre are credited to Utagawa Kuniaki I, a pupil of Kunisada active until 1868. The production of yokohama-e ceased in the 1880s."

== Artists ==
The most prolific artists working in this genre were Utagawa Yoshitora, Utagawa Yoshikazu, Utagawa Sadahide, Utagawa Yoshiiku, Utagawa Yoshimori, Utagawa Hiroshige II, Utagawa Hiroshige III, Utagawa Yoshitoyo, and Utagawa Yoshitomi.

== Gallery ==
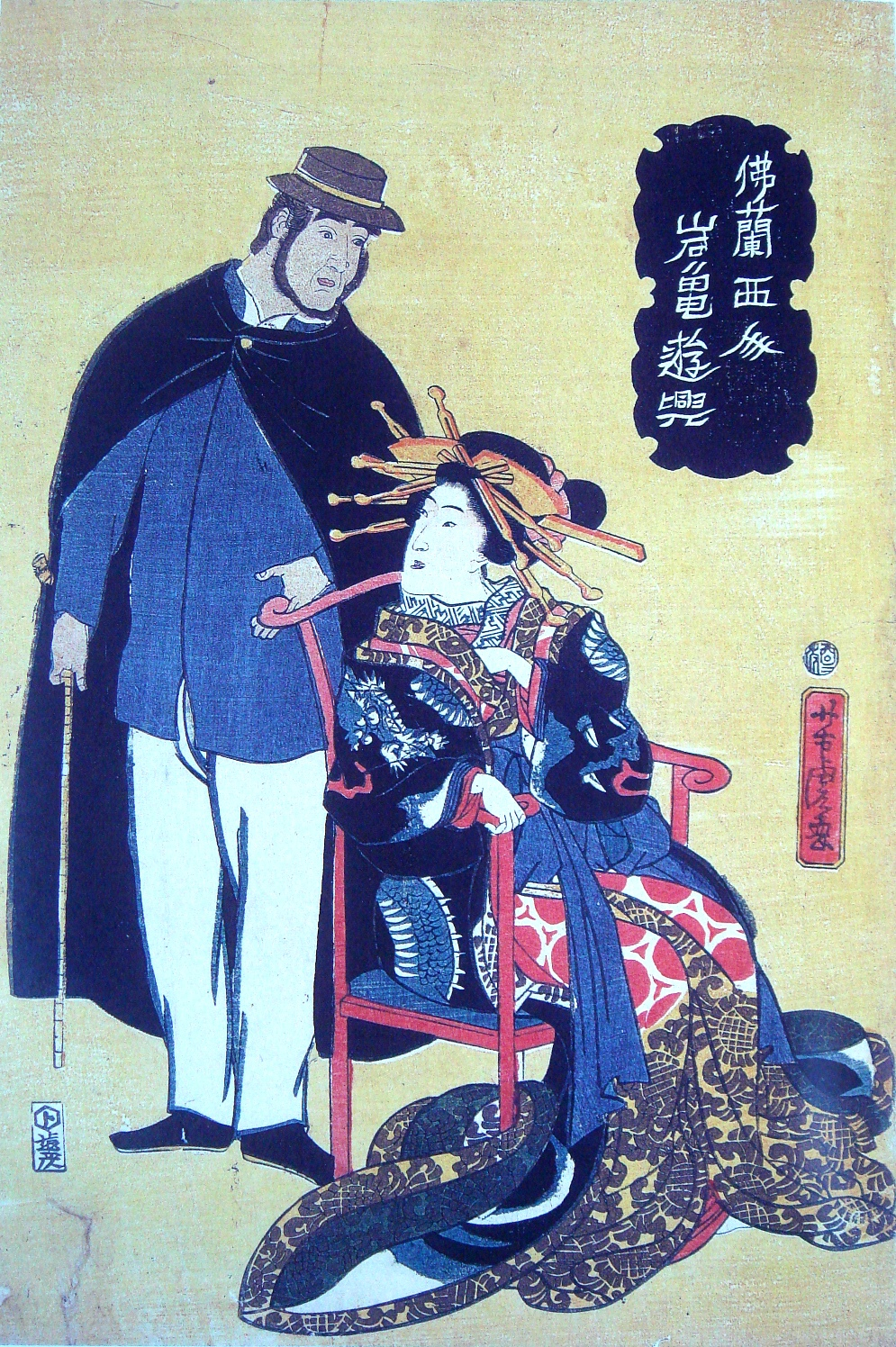
Woodblock print by Utagawa Yoshitora of a Frenchman at the Gankirō brothel, 1861

First steam train leaving Yokohama, triptych by Utagawa Kunisada II, 1872

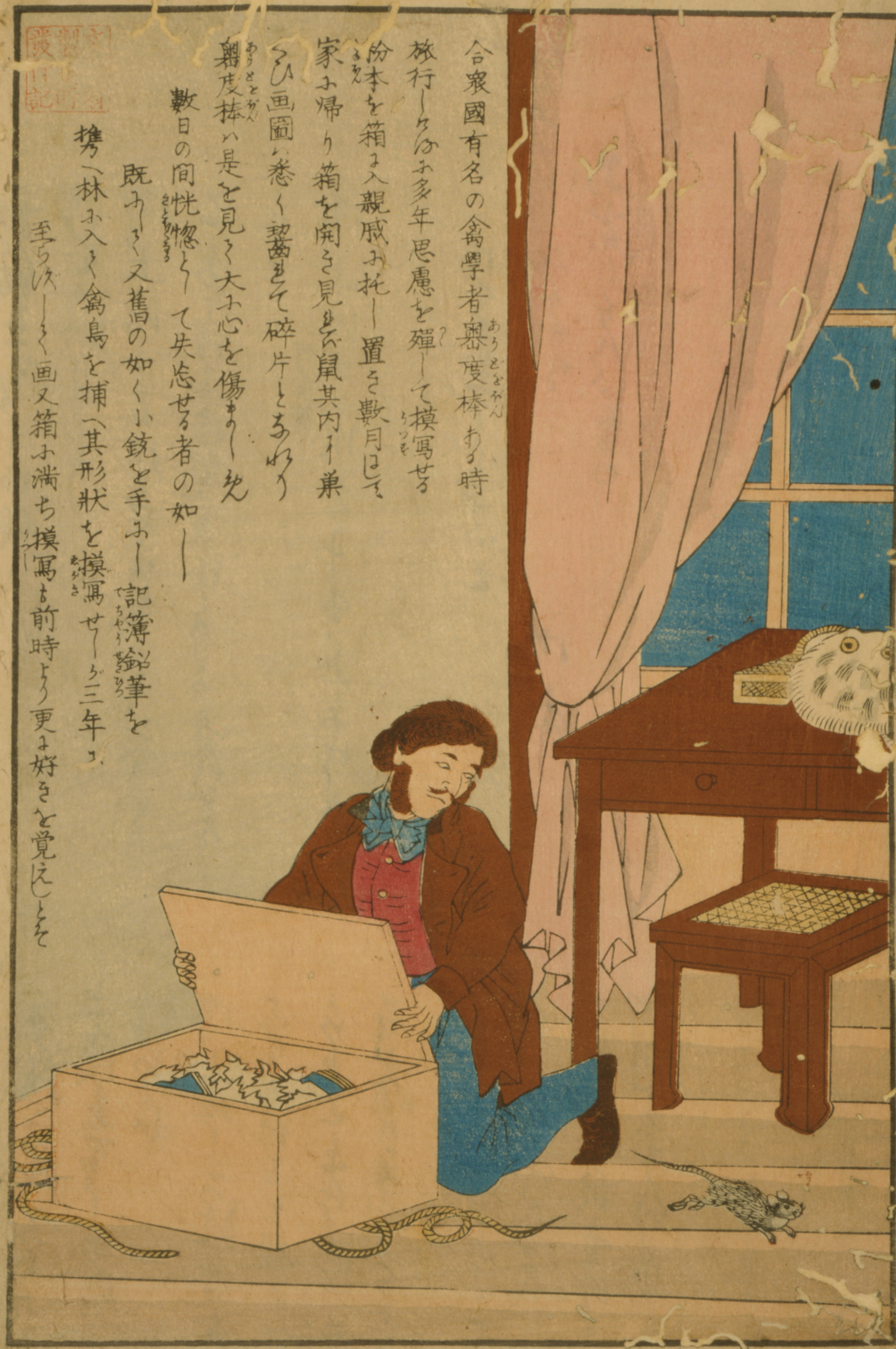
Japanese print showing American naturalist and ornithologist John James Audubon (1785–1851) discovering that his work was eaten by a rat, unsigned

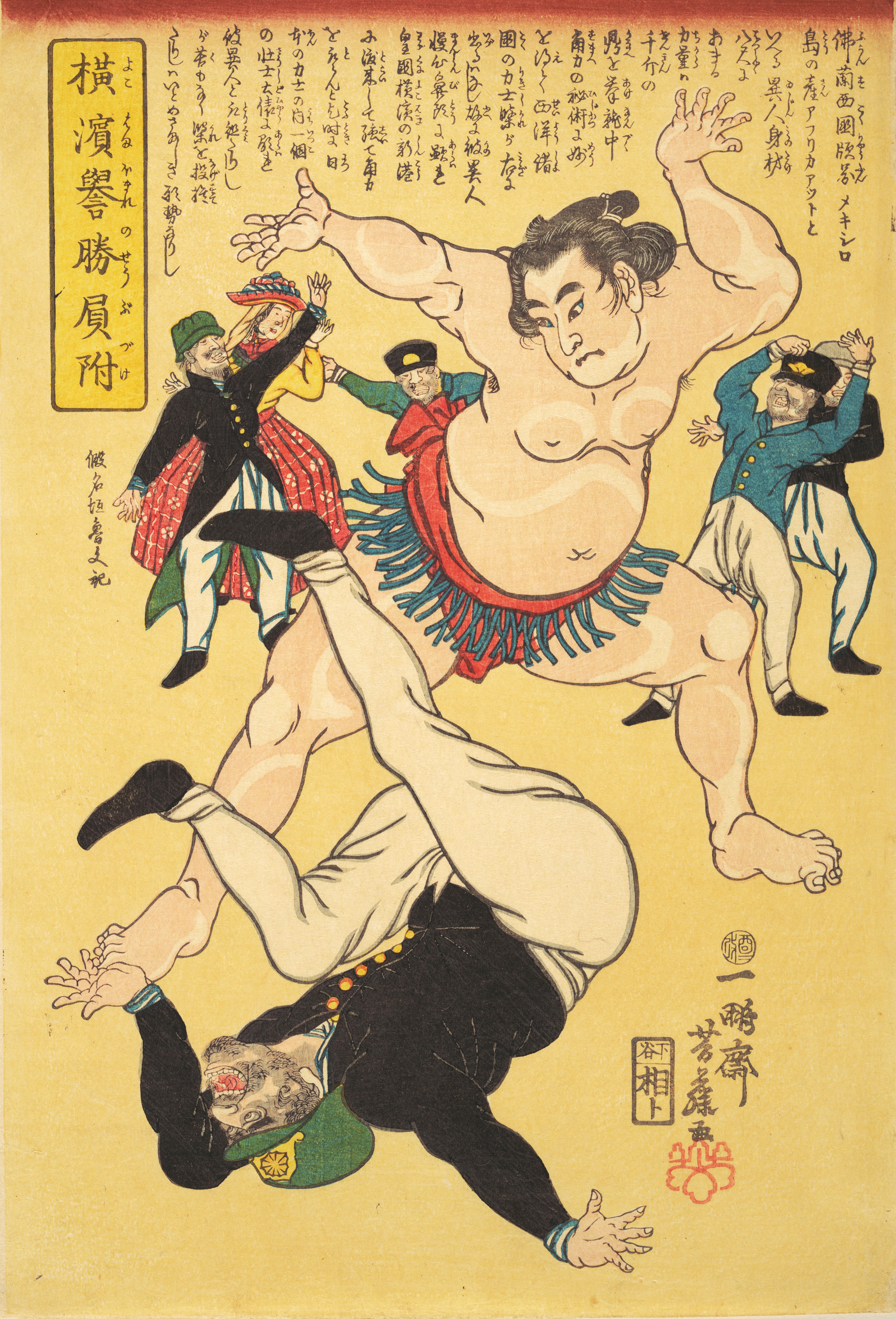
Sumo wrestler throwing a foreigner at Yokohama by Utagawa Yoshifuji, 1861

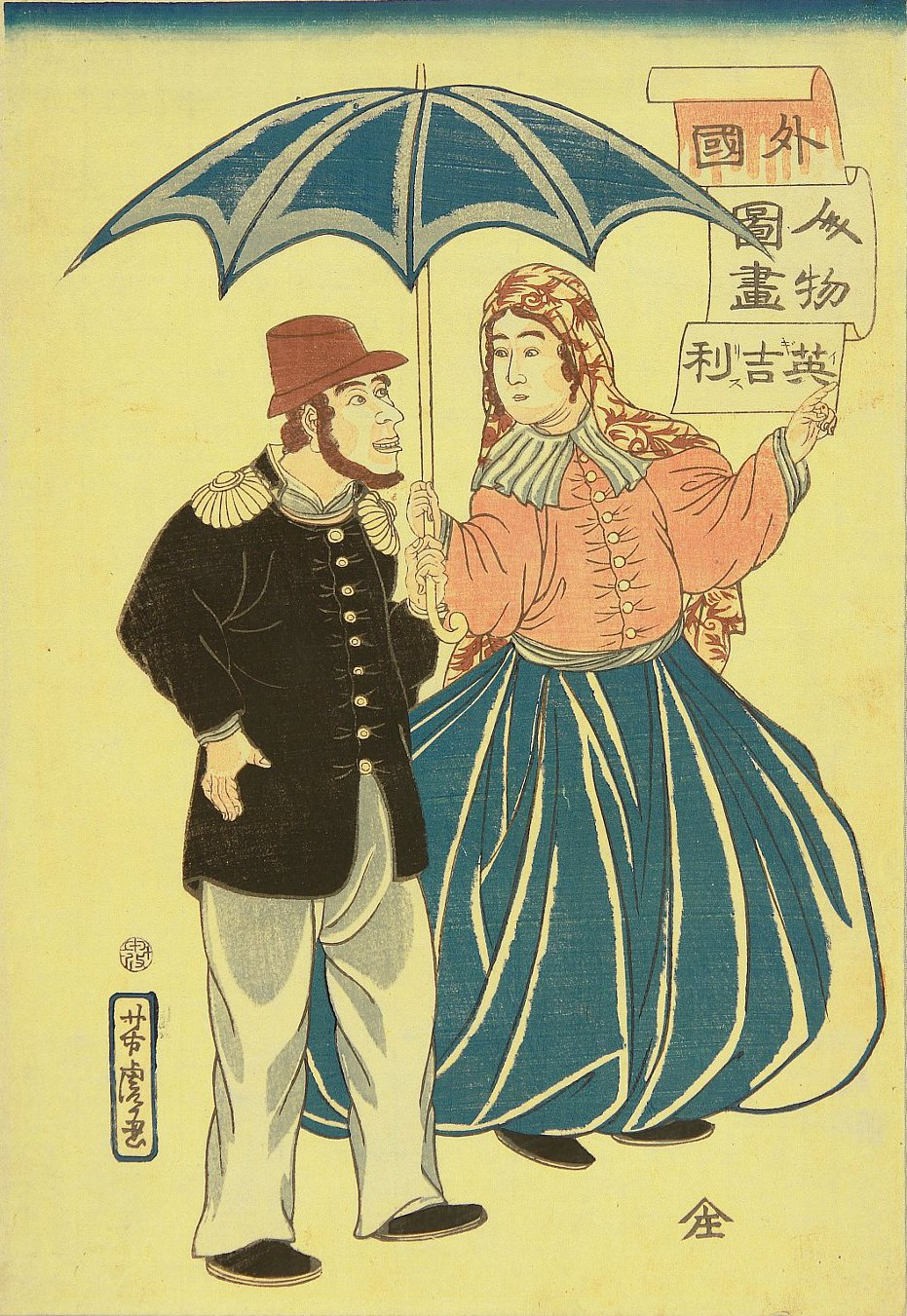
Utagawa Yoshitora (1860) English Couple

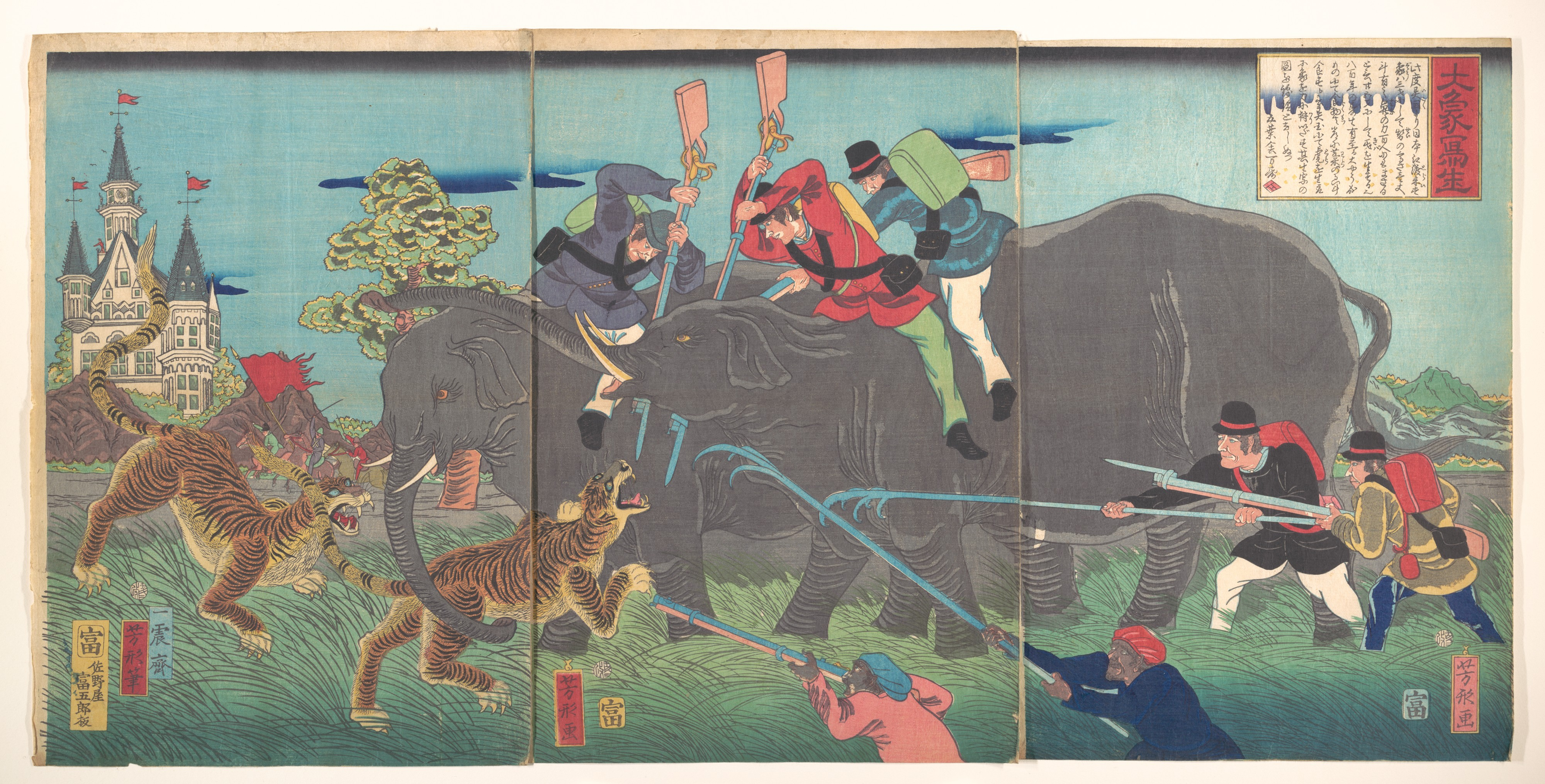
Big Elephants Being Attacked, by Isshinsai Yoshikata, 2nd month, 1863

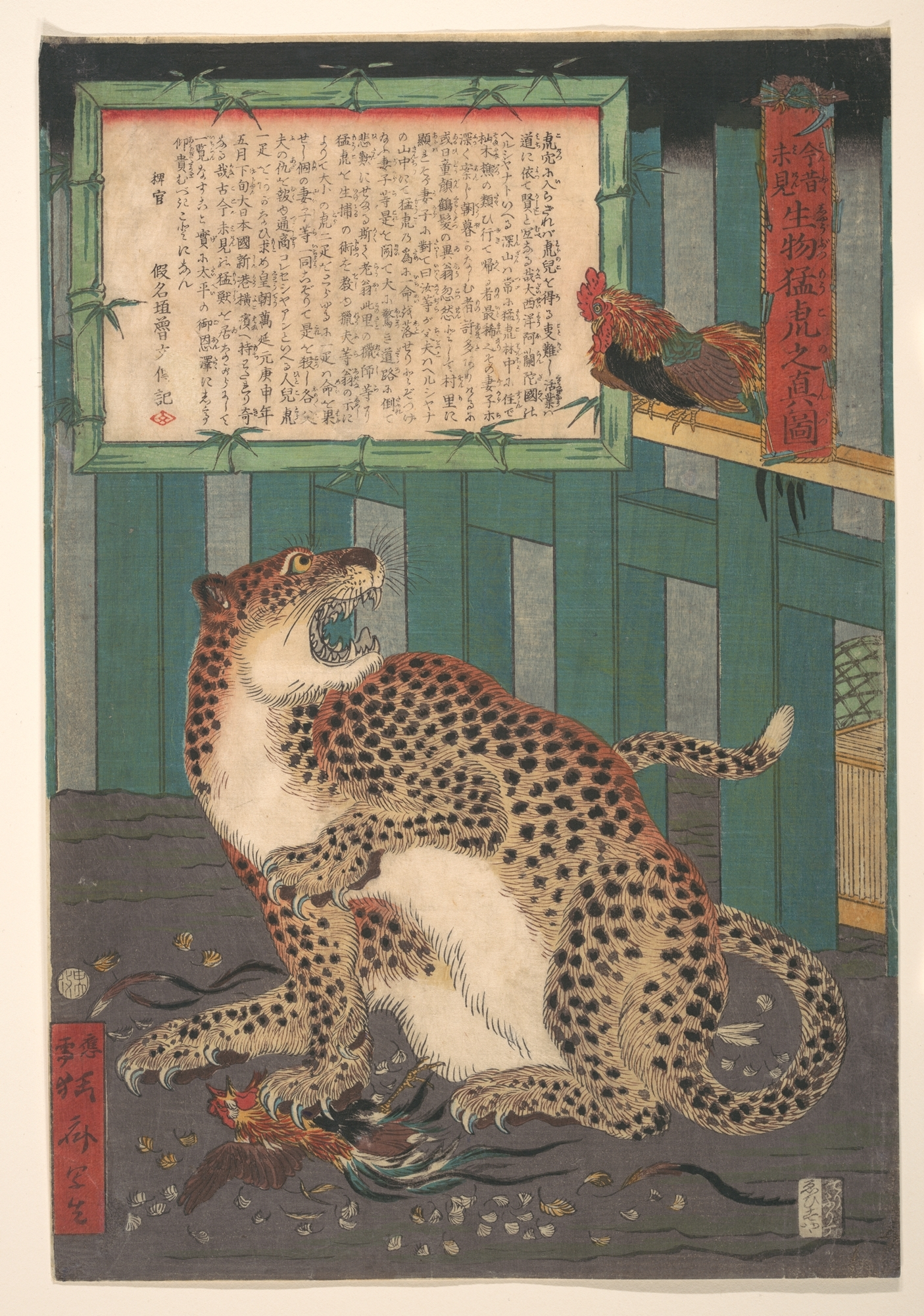
Never Seen Before: True Picture of a Live Wild Tiger, by Kawanabe Kyōsai, 1860
