= Utagawa Kunisada III =

Japanese artist

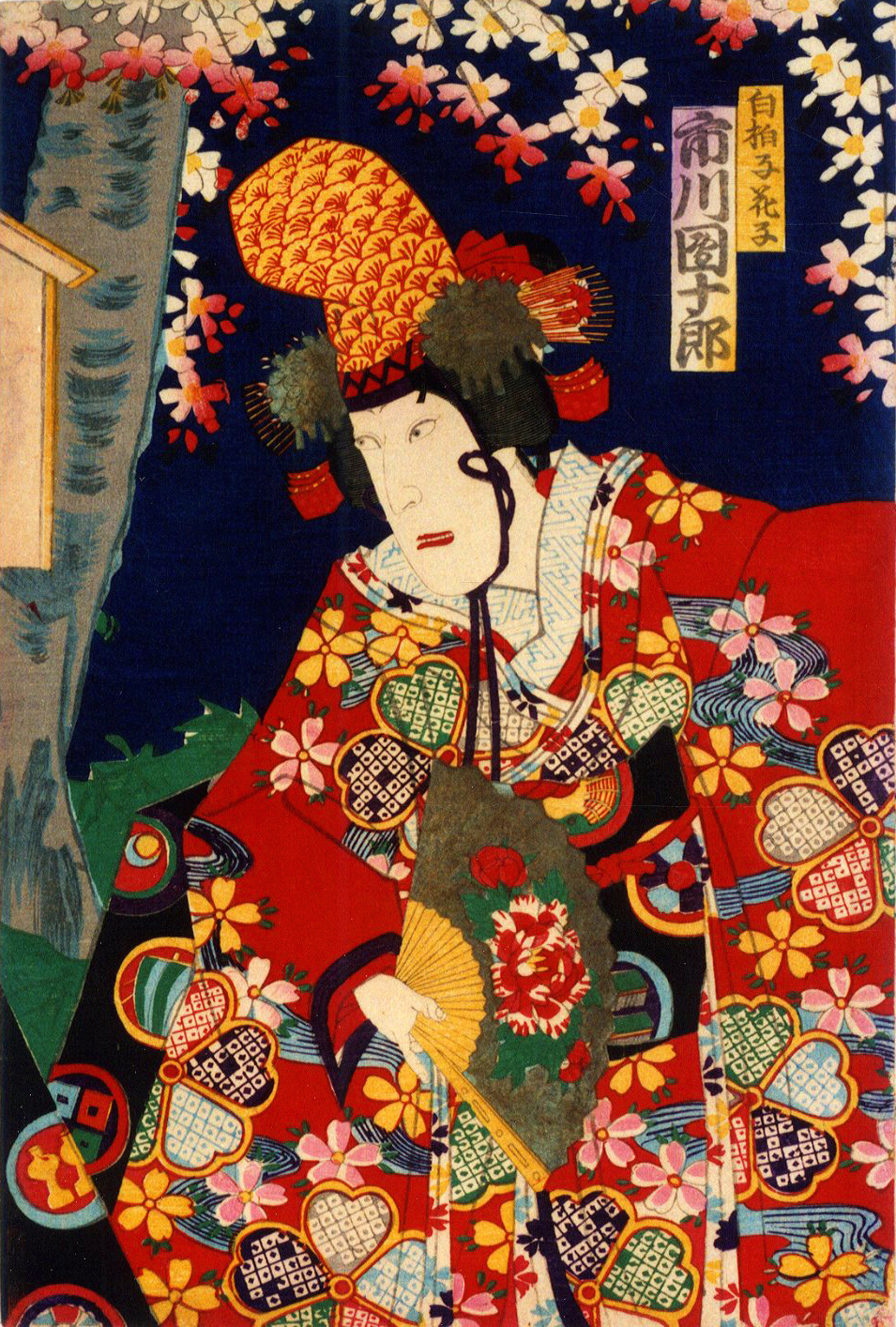
Danjūrō Ichikawa IV as Shirabyōshi Hanakjo in the April 1884 Tokyo Ichimura-za production of Chinzei Hachirō Eiketsu Monogatari, Act II Shunshoku Ninin Dōjōji, by Kunimasa Utagawa IV (1848–1920).

Utagawa Kunisada III (歌川国貞) (1848–1920) was an ukiyo-e printmaker of the Utagawa school, specializing in yakusha-e (pictures of kabuki actors). He was born in Edo as Hidehisa Takenouchi. He began studying under Utagawa Kunisada I at the age of 10, and continued under Kunisada II after their master's death.

He originally signed his prints "Kunimasa" or "Baidō Kunimasa". About 1889, he began signing his prints "Kunisada", "Baidō Kunisada" or "Kōchōrō Kunisada". By 1892, he was using "Hōsai", "Kōchōrō Hōsai", "Baidō Hōsai", and "Utagawa Hōsai". Later in his career he also adopted the name Toyokuni V. In addition to yakusha-e, he produced ehon (illustrated books), e-sugoroku (board-game prints), senso-e (war prints), and kaika-e (prints depicting the "civilization and enlightenment" of the Meiji era).

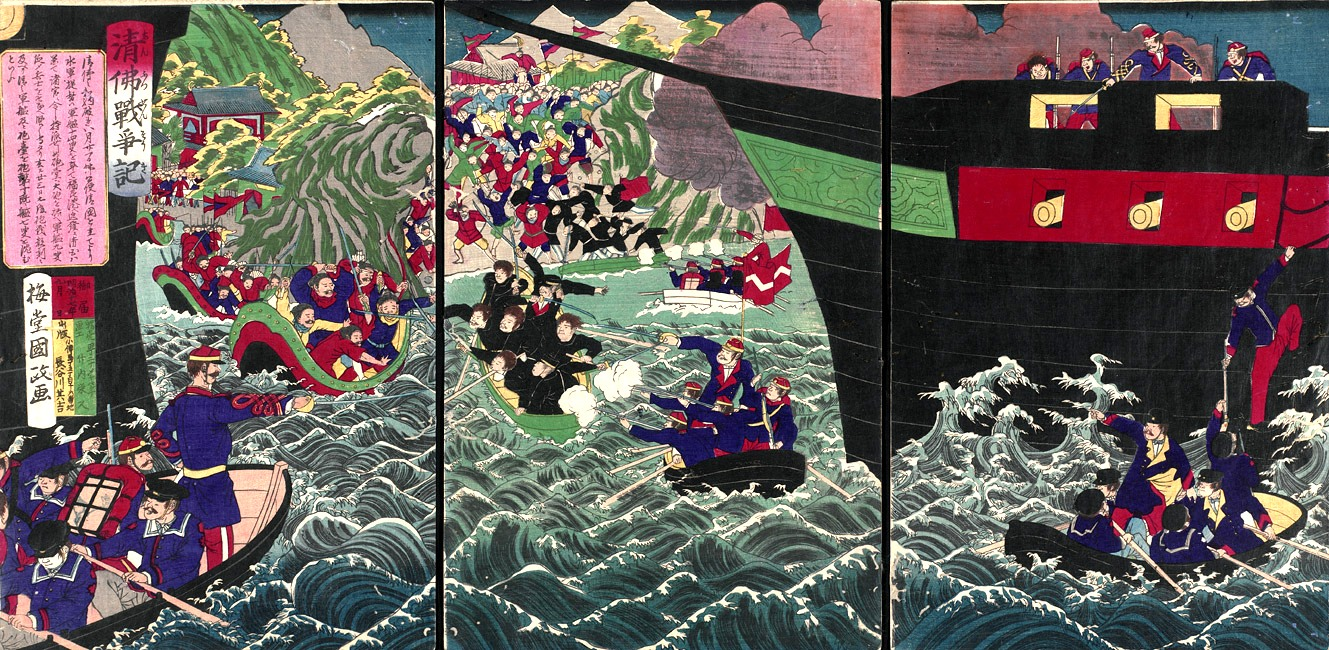
Sino-French War, 1884.
