= Sadahide =

Japanese artist

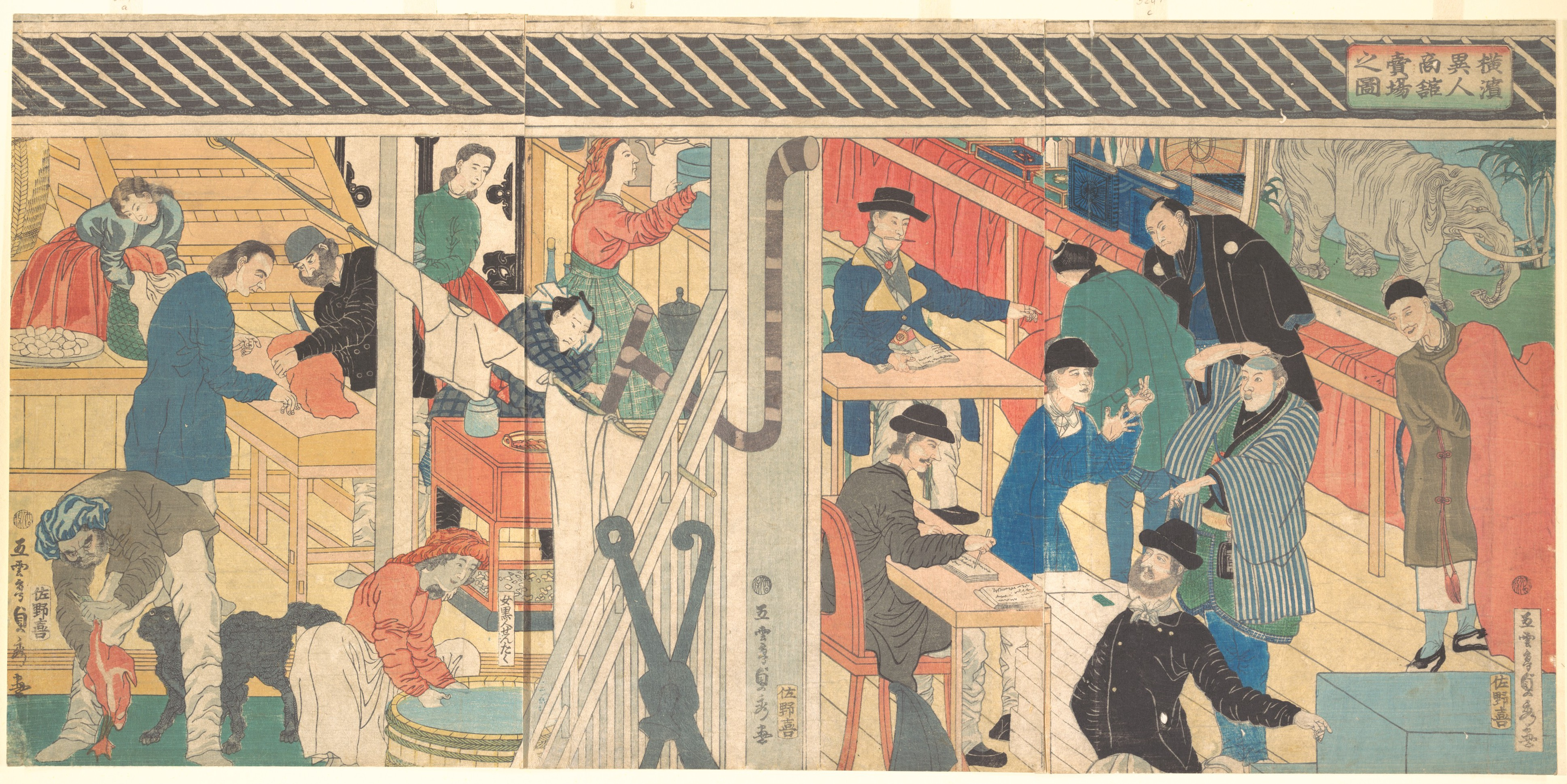
Foreign Traders in Yokohama, triptych print, 1861

Utagawa Sadahide (歌川 貞秀; 1807 – c. 1878–1879), also known as Gountei Sadahide (五雲亭 貞秀), was a Japanese artist best known for his prints in the ukiyo-e style as a member of the Utagawa school. His prints covered a wide variety of genres; amongst his best known are his Yokohama-e pictures of foreigners in Yokohama in the 1860s, a period when he was a best-selling artist. His work was chosen by the Tokugawa shogunate's delegation to be displayed at the International Exposition of 1867 in Paris.

== Life and career ==
Sadahide was born Hashimoto Kenjirō (橋本兼次郎) in 1807 in Fusa Province (modern Chiba Prefecture) in Shimōsa. He joined Utagawa school master Kunisada's studio in the 1820s and become one of the master's most prominent students. As a member of the school, he took on Utagawa as a surname, and also used the surname Gountei as an art name, and also used his birth surname as an art name late in his career. In addition, when Utagawa Kunisada succeeded to the art name of Utagawa Toyokuni, his students followed suit and changed "Sada (貞)" to "Kuni (国)", but Sadahide did not change his art name.

Sadahide's earliest known works are the illustrations for a book Misaogata Tsuge no Ogushi (操形黄楊小櫛, 1824), the first of many books he was to illustrate throughout his career. In 1828 three years after the death of Utagawa Toyokuni, Utagawa Kunisada built a stone monument in Myokendo (妙見堂), on which the names of his students were inscribed, and Sadahide was the fourth name on the monument at the age of only 21. Most of his early works were bijin-ga portraits of beauties. In the 1830s and 1840s he broadened his output to landscapes and musha-e warrior prints. In particular, he excelled at painting bird's eye view of landscapes based on his research by actually walking around the land.

Sadahide's series Kanadehon Chūshingura, published in 1848 in ōban yoko-e format by Fukugawadō, marks a clear point of evolution in his art: rather than attempting to pack as much narrative detail as possible into a single image to convey the sprawling, richly branching story of the Chūshingura, Sadahide instead concentrated on forging visually appealing ukiyo-e images, recalling the landscape style of Hiroshige's fūkeiga.

In the 1850s Sadahide began to become known for his prints of exotic locales. In c. 1850 he produced the five-volume Kaigai Shinwa (海外新話, New Overseas Stories) about the First Opium War in China, and in 1855 he produced the four-volume Kita Ezo zusetsu (北蝦夷図説, Northern Japan Illustrated), which depicted the Ainu people in Ezo, the name at the time for the northernmost parts of Japan. This interest expanded to maps: he produces prints of maps of Edo, Yokohama, Japan, and the world—this last quite accurate and likely modeled after a Dutch example. His largest map was a nine-sheet panorama of Yokohama with a breadth of two metres.

In the 1859 to 1862 Sadahide produced a large number of Yokohama-e prints of foreigners and the goods they brought to Japan after the country ended its self-imposed isolation in 1854. Among these prints was the series Edo meisho kenbutsu ijin, (江戸名所見物偉人, Foreigners Viewing Famous Places in Edo). While there is scant evidence of the reception of these works, the number of extant copies suggests they were popular, and they appear to depict foreigners in a positive light. Several prints depict pleasant interactions between foreigner and Japanese figures, such as dining together or playing badminton. This in contrast to the philosophy of sonnō jōi ("revere the Emperor, expel the barbarians") that had gained currency since the Convention of Kanagawa of 1854.

Sadahide also produced guidebooks to Yokohama, include one of five volumes in 1862–66 called Yokohama kaikō kenbun-shi (横浜開港見聞誌, Things seen and heard at the Yokohama open port). He details the eating habits and technology of Yokohama's foreign residents, and suggests the Japanese would do well to learn from the West with such statements as: "We are by nature emotional and want a quick profit, but nowadays the Japanese merchants in Yokohama are trying hard to follow the Western model of remaining calm." While these works emphasize contrasts between the Japanese and foreigners, they also dispel myths: Sadahide notes that not all foreigners are tall or have long noses, despite the stereotypes.

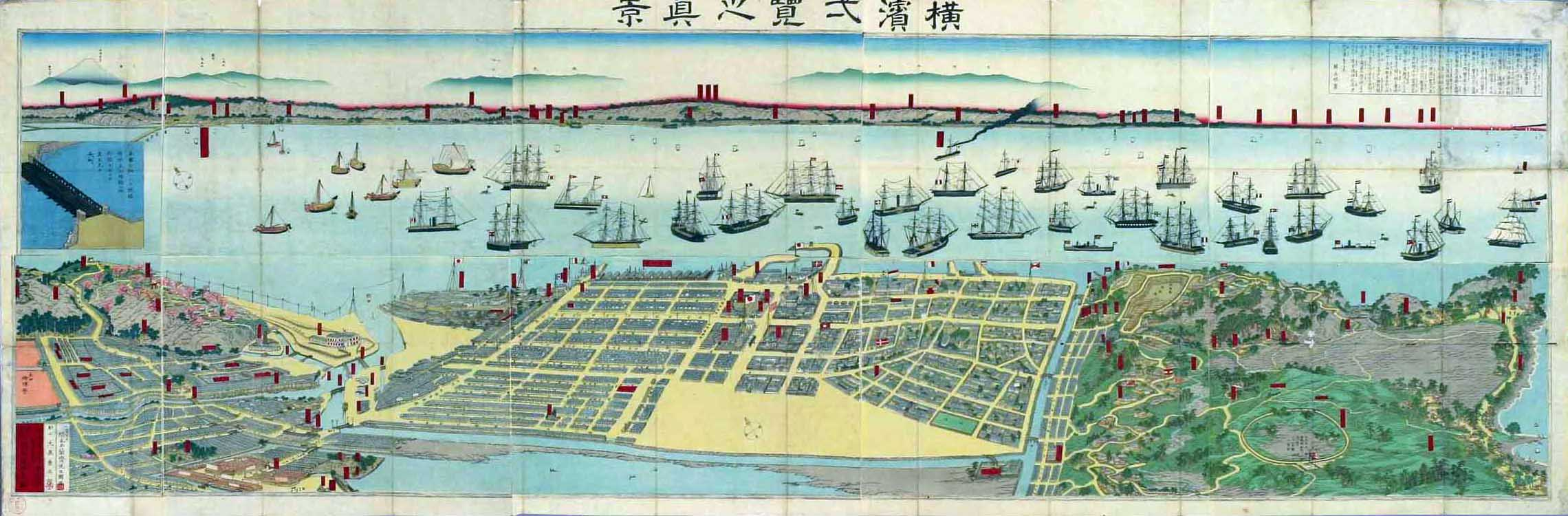
Yokohama yokuran no shinkei (Panoramic view of Yokohama) 1871

The artist continued to make prints after moving to Nagasaki. There Sadahide made a panorama that was 10 metres (33 ft) long and produced books on the history and geography of Western lands. He joined ten other artists as part of a delegation the Tokugawa shogunate sent to the International Exposition of 1867 in Paris, where ten of his Edo views were exhibited. The following year, it was reported he ranked the best-selling ukiyo-e artist. Sadahide died in 1878 or 1879, shortly after producing a print of Yokohama the size of a tatami mat in 1871 entitled "Yokohama yokuran no shinkei". The first exhibition dedicated to Sadahide's work was held in 1997, subtitled The ukiyo-e artist who flies in the sky (空飛ぶ浮世絵師 Sora tobu ukiyo-e-shi).

His work is held in several museums worldwide, including the Fine Arts Museum of San Francisco, the Minneapolis Institute of Art, the Dallas Museum of Art, the Five Colleges and Historic Deerfield Museum Consortium, the Arizona State University Art Museum, the Honolulu Museum of Art, the Brooklyn Museum, the British Museum, the Philadelphia Museum of Art, the Metropolitan Museum of Art, the Van Gogh Museum, the National Museum of New Zealand, the Museum of Fine Arts, Boston, the Victoria and Albert Museum, the Saint Louis Art Museum, the Indianapolis Museum of Art, the University of Michigan Museum of Art, the Suntory Museum of Art, the Carnegie Museum of Art, the Harvard Art Museums, and the National Museum of Korea.

Prints by Utagawa Sadahide

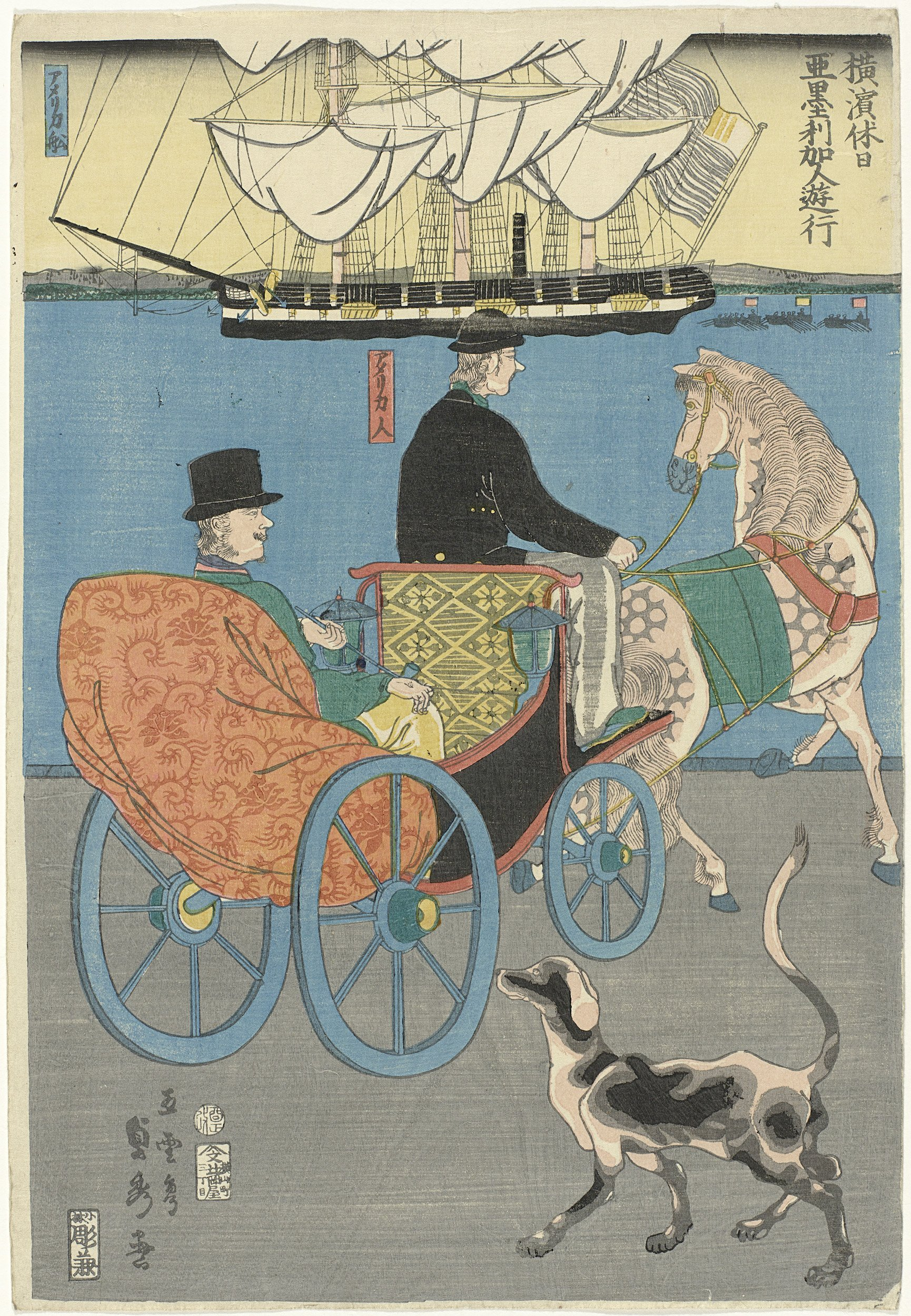
American on an Outing, 1861

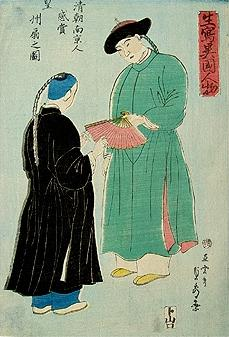
Chinese Men in Yokohama, c. 1860

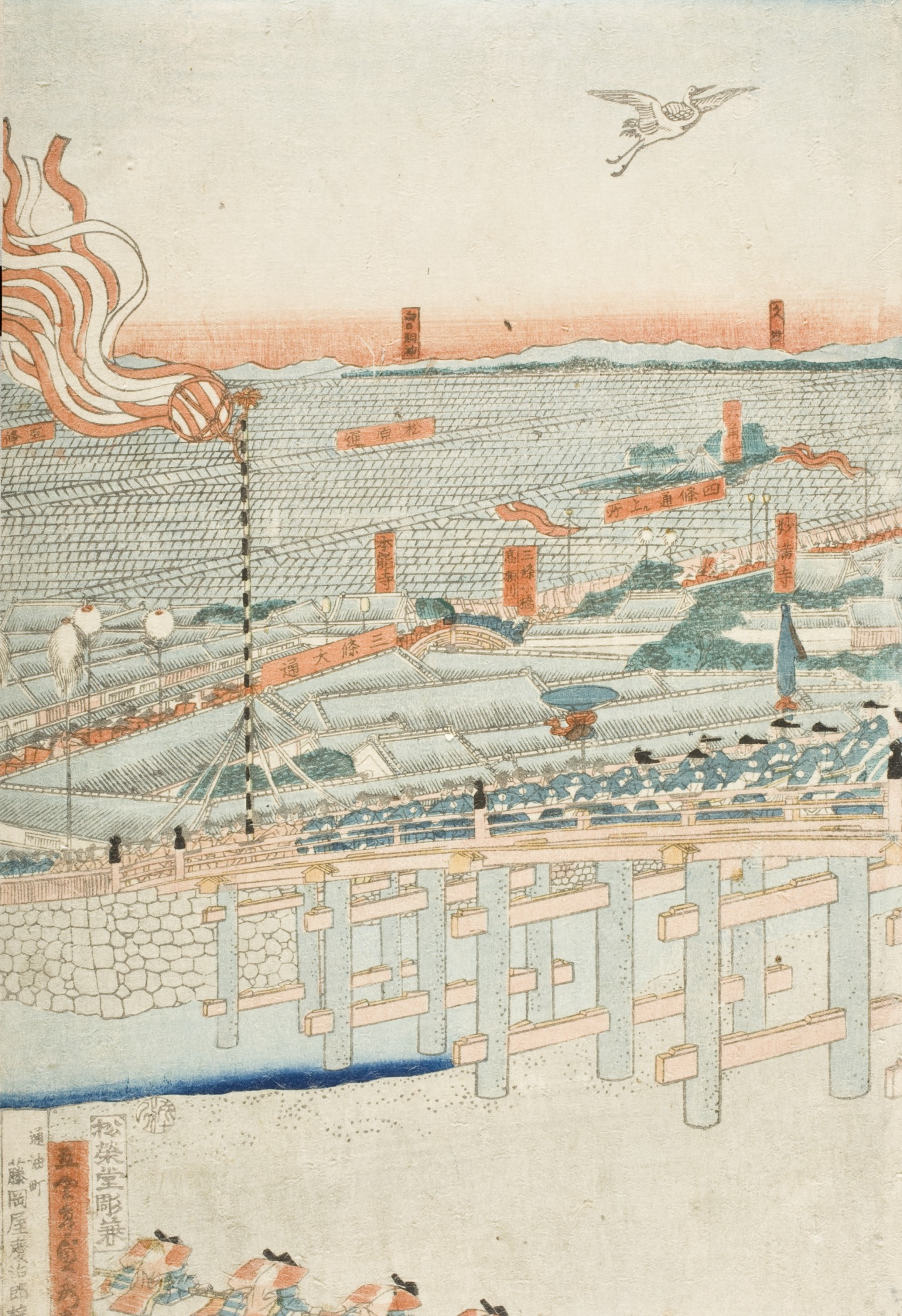
Lord Yoritomo Traveling to Kyoto (1), 1862

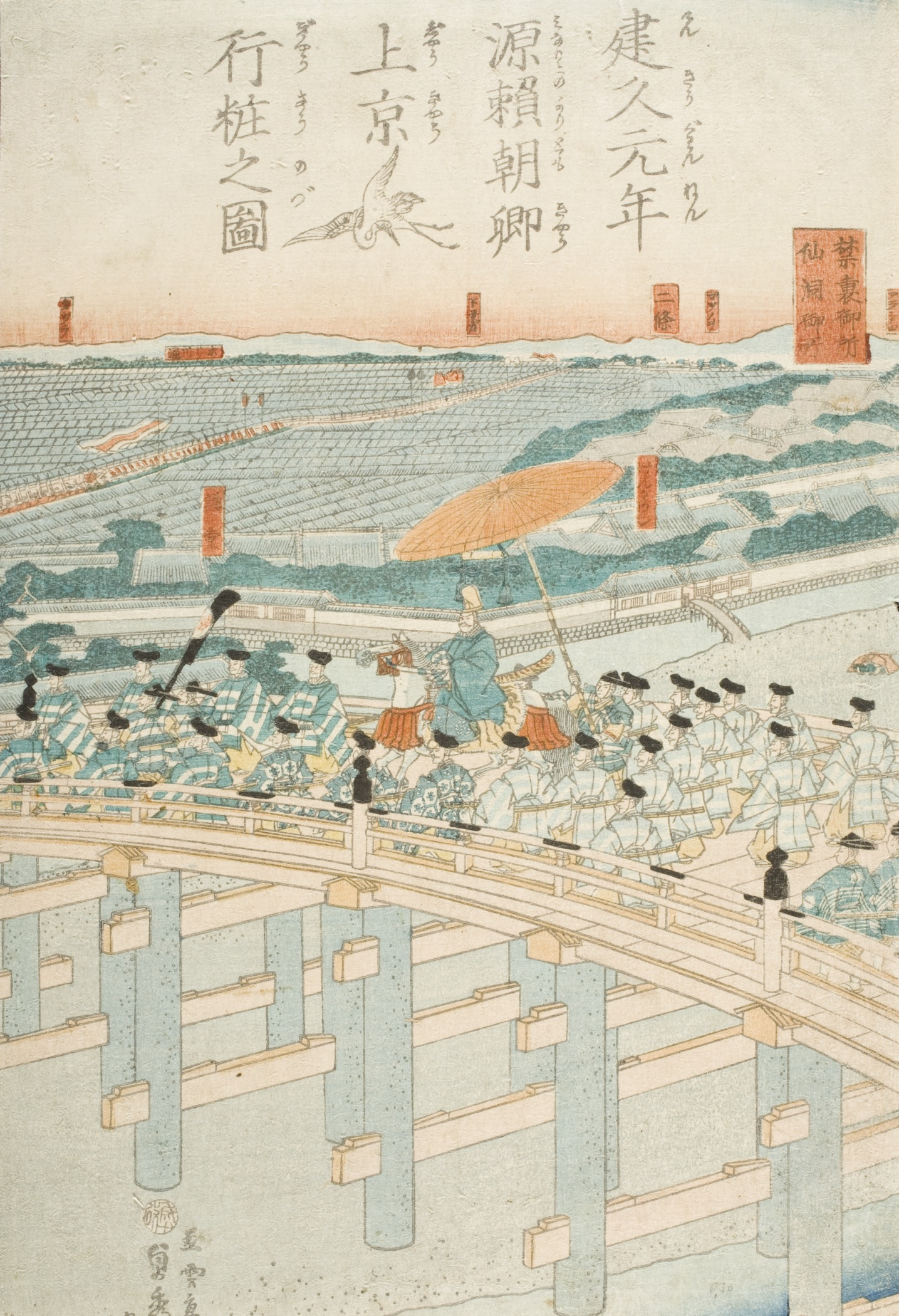
Lord Yoritomo Traveling to Kyoto (2), 1862

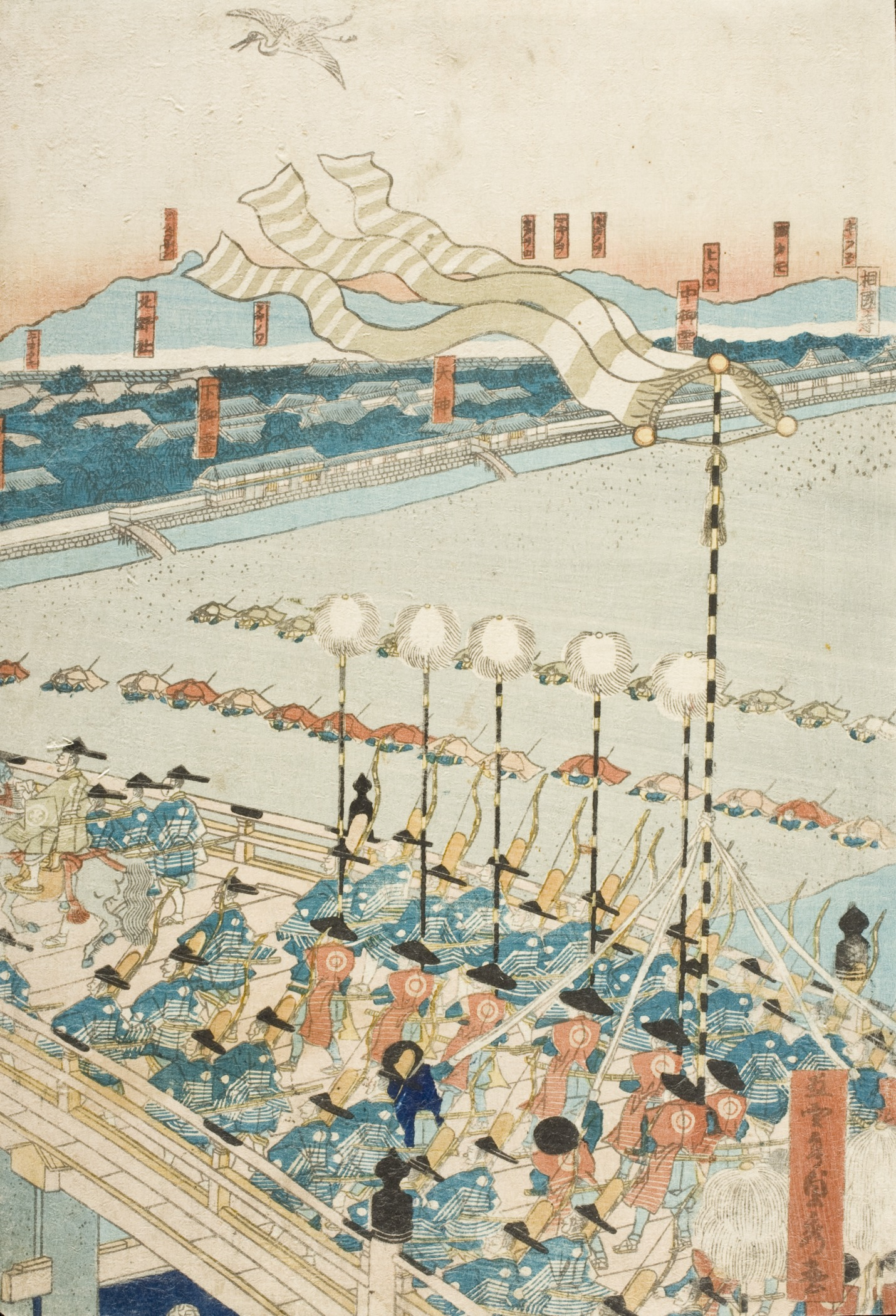
Lord Yoritomo Traveling to Kyoto (3), 1862
