= Utagawa Yoshitora =

Japanese artist (1836–1880)

Utagawa Yoshitora (歌川 芳虎) was a designer of ukiyo-e Japanese woodblock prints and an illustrator of books and newspapers who was active from about 1850 to about 1880. He was born in Edo (modern Tokyo), but neither his date of birth nor date of death is known. However, he was the oldest pupil of Utagawa Kuniyoshi who excelled in prints of warriors, kabuki actors, beautiful women, and foreigners (Yokohama-e). He may not have seen any of the foreign scenes he depicted.

Yoshitora was prolific: he produced over 60 print series and illustrated over 100 books. In 1849 he produced an irreverent print called Dōke musha: Miyo no wakamochi ("Funny Warriors—Our Ruler's New Year's Rice Cakes"), which depicts Oda Nobunaga, Akechi Mitsuhide, and Toyotomi Hideyoshi making mochi rice cakes for the shōgun Tokugawa Ieyasu. A poem by Sawaya Kōkichi accompanies it, reading "Kimi ga yo wo tsuki katametari haru no mochi" ("Tamping down the reign firm and solid like spring rice cakes"). Censors interpreted the print as a criticism of authority and had Yoshitora manacled for fifty days. Soon after Yoshitora was expelled from Kuniyoshi's studio, possibly due to the print, but he continued to produce illustrations prolifically.

From the 1860s Yoshitora produced Yokohama-e pictures of foreigners amid rapid modernization that came to Japan after the country was opened to trade. Among the inventions imported from abroad, Yoshitora was particularly fascinated by the small steam train that, from the summer of 1872, would connect Shinagawa (Tokyo) with Yokohama. In 1871, in fact, he produced the print Tokyo Takanawa Kaigan Jōkisha Tetsudō Hashiriyuki no Sen Zu, presumably based purely on his imagination of a steam train, informed by American or European illustrations, since plans for the railway line had only been announced in 1870; the new means of transport immediately became emblematic of civilisation and enlightenment, prompting publishers to rush out dozens of prints depicting it, including two by Kuniteru II showing an almost identical view, but with a slightly more sophisticated-looking train. He collaborated on a number of landscape series, and in the Meiji period that began in 1868 he also worked in newspapers. The last of his known works appeared in 1882.

Works by Yoshitora

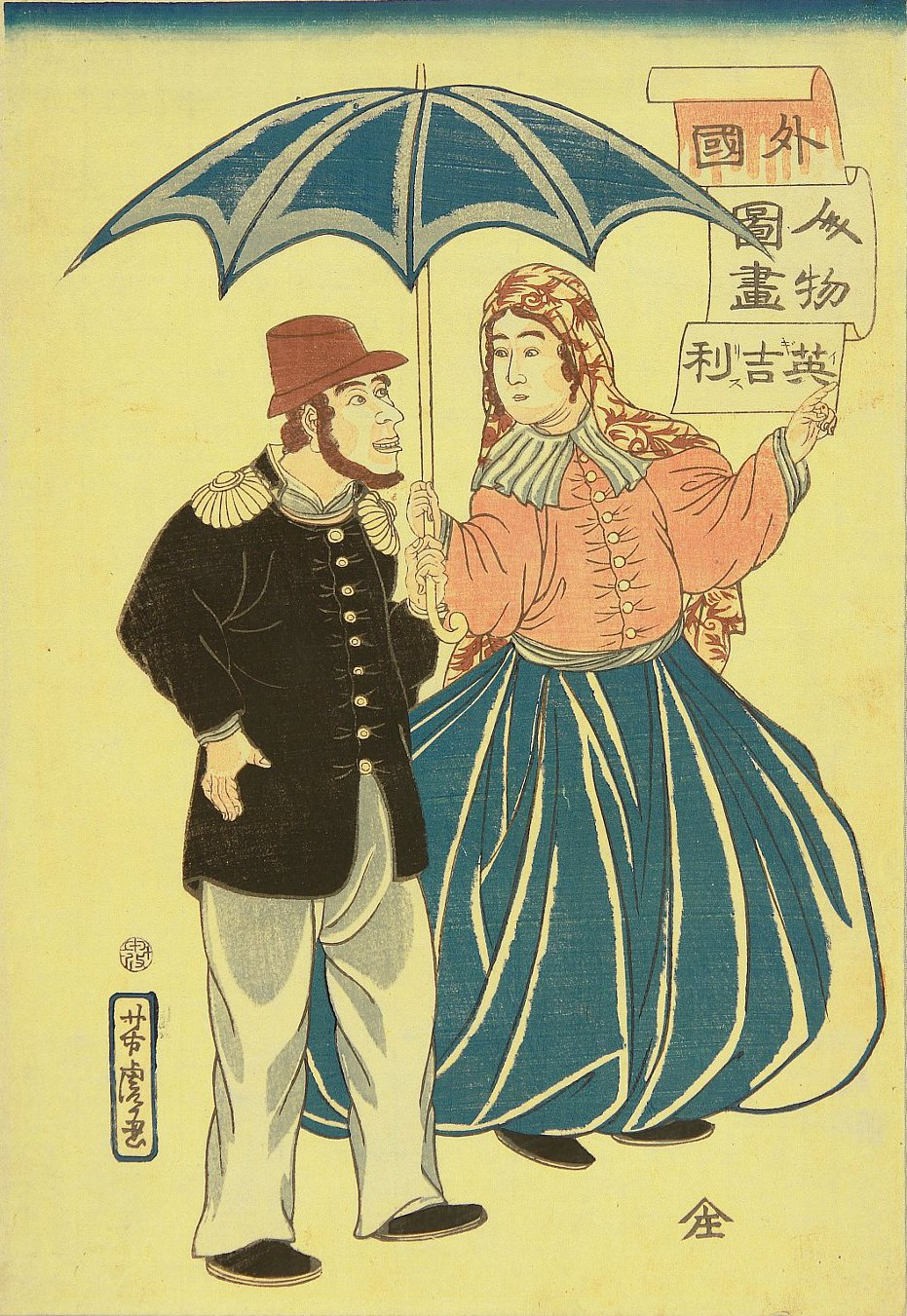
Utagawa Yoshitora (1860) English Couple

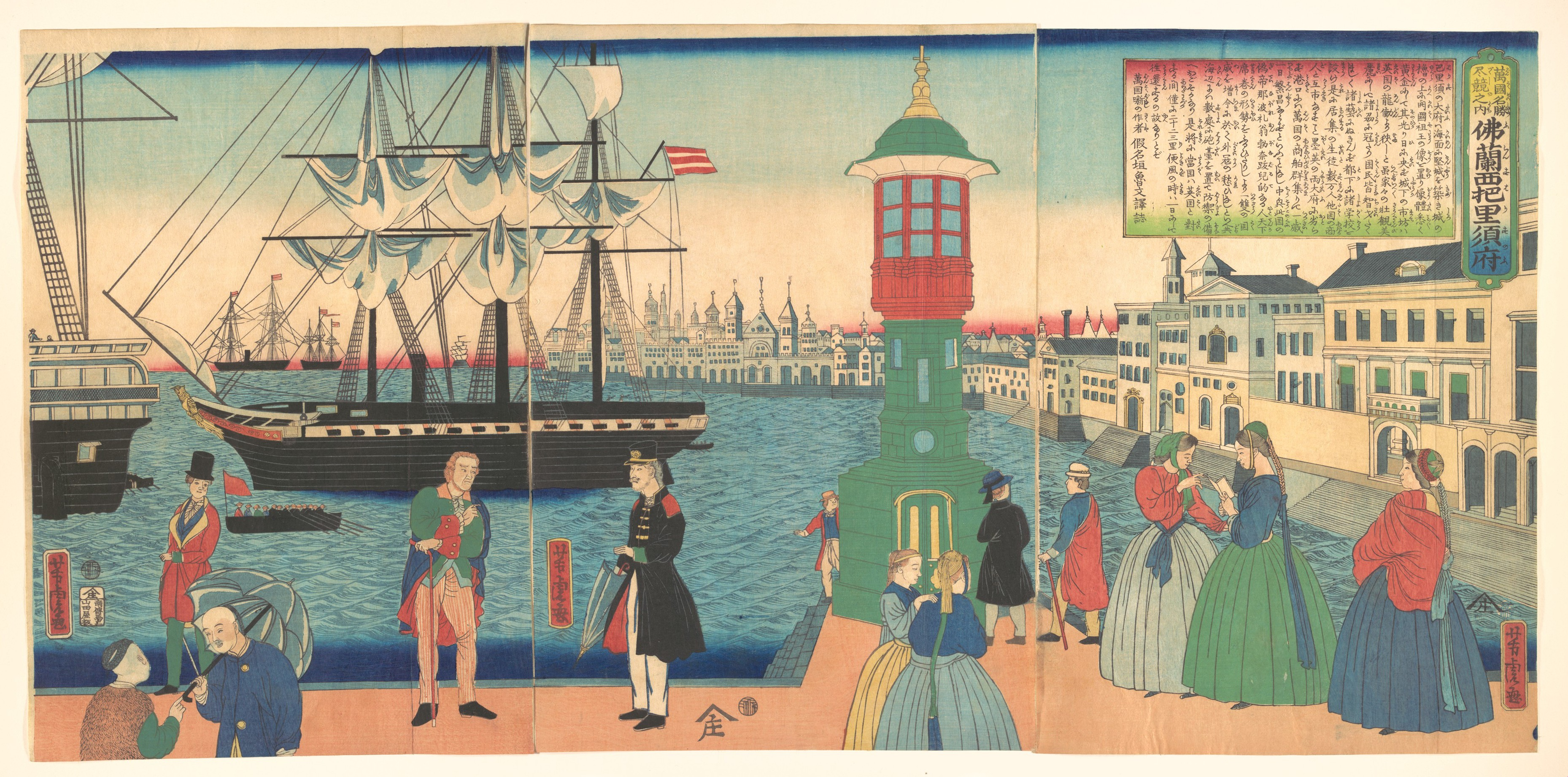
Utagawa Yoshitora, Paris, France, 1862

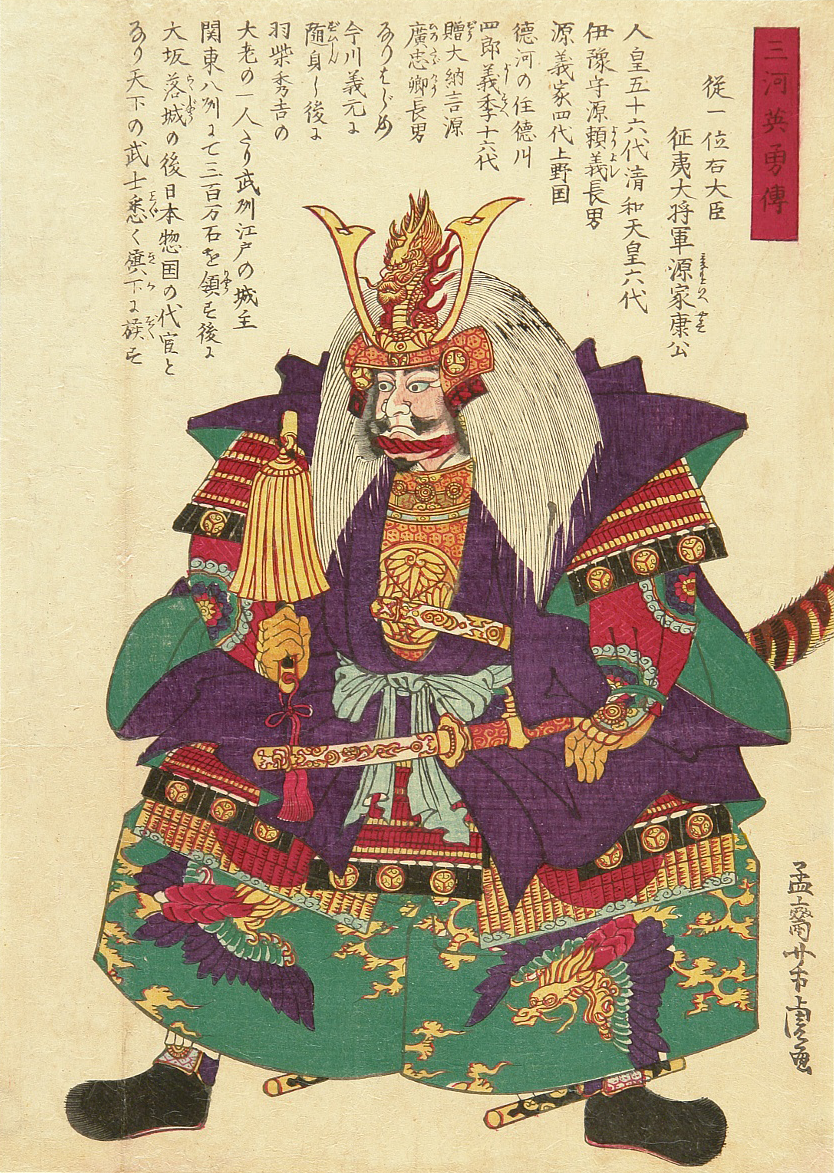
Shogun Tokugawa Ieyasu

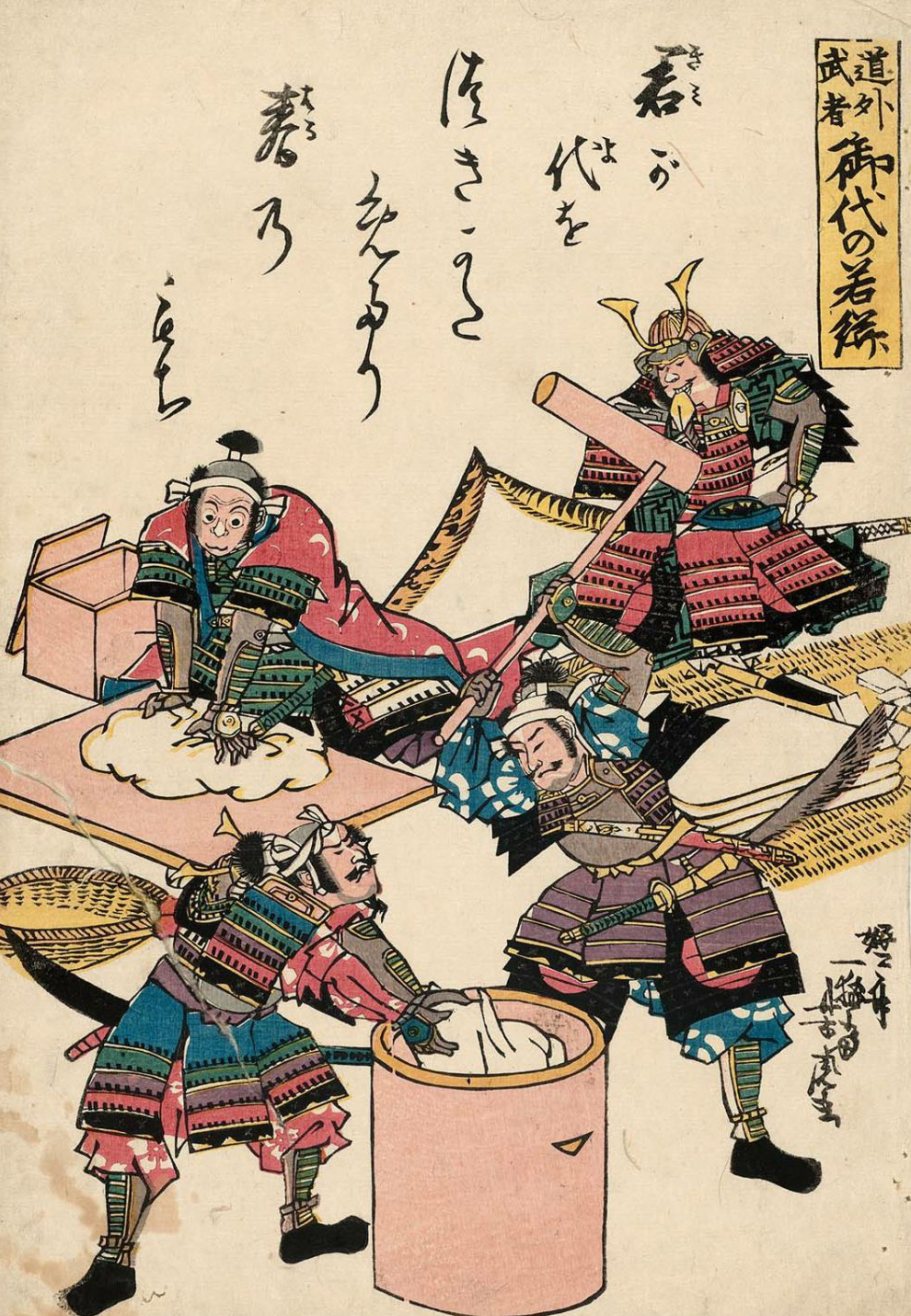
Miyo no wakamochi

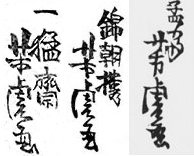
Signatures of Utagawa Yoshitora reading from left to right:
•"Ichimōsai Yoshitora ga" (一猛斎 芳虎 画)
•"Kinchōrō Yoshitora ga" (錦朝楼 芳虎 画)
•"Mōsai Yoshitora ga" (孟斎 芳虎 画)

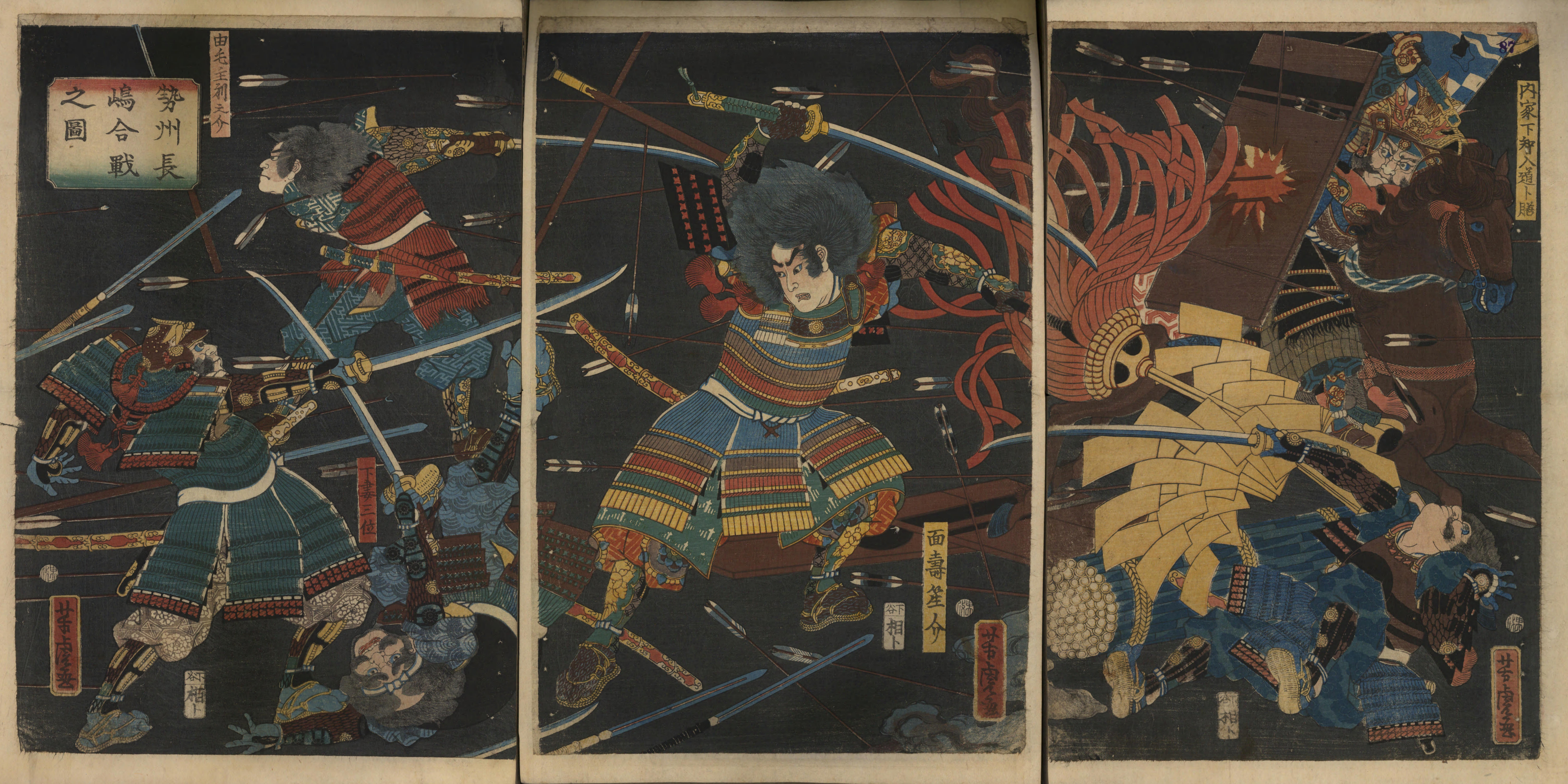

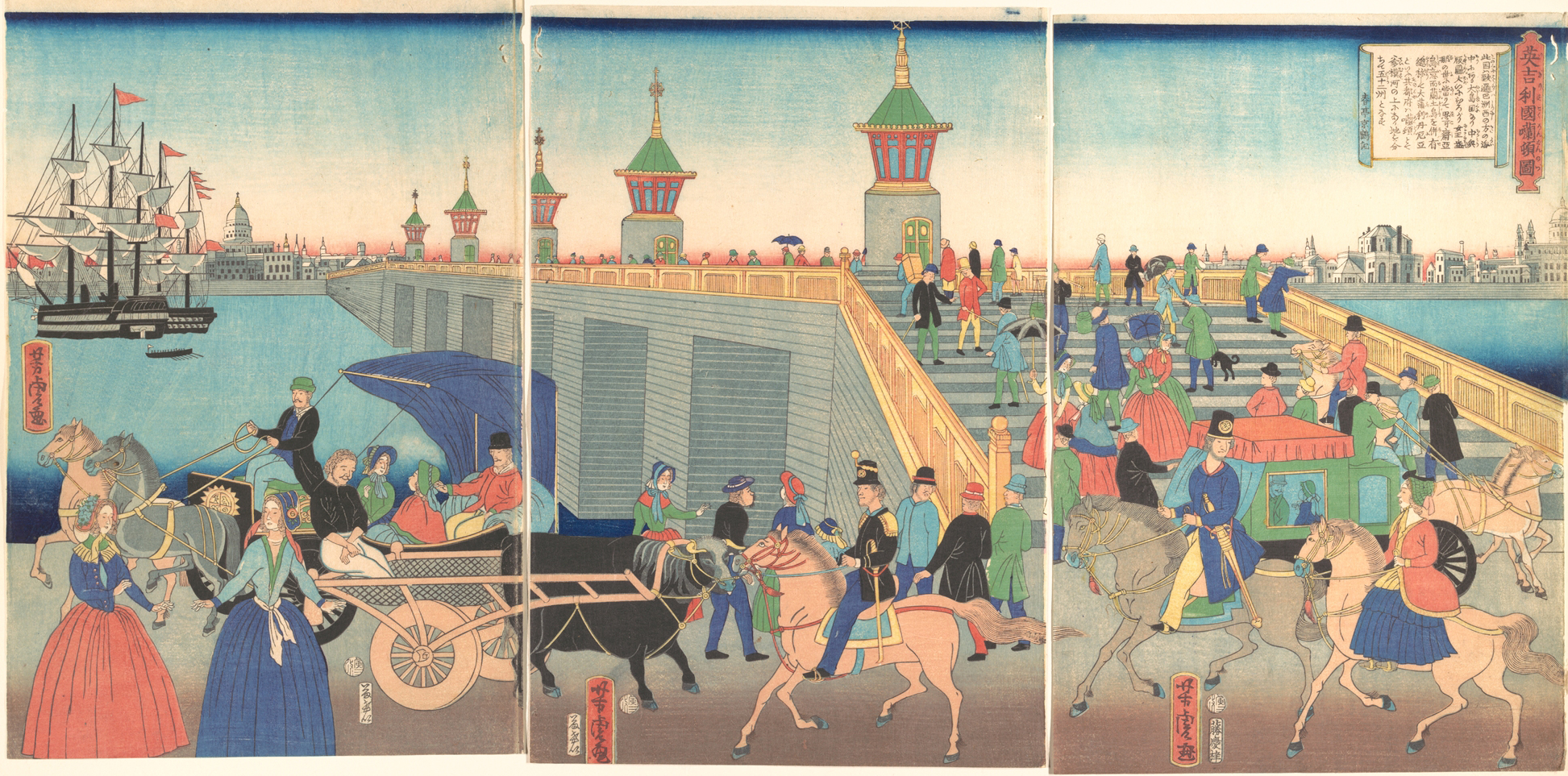
London

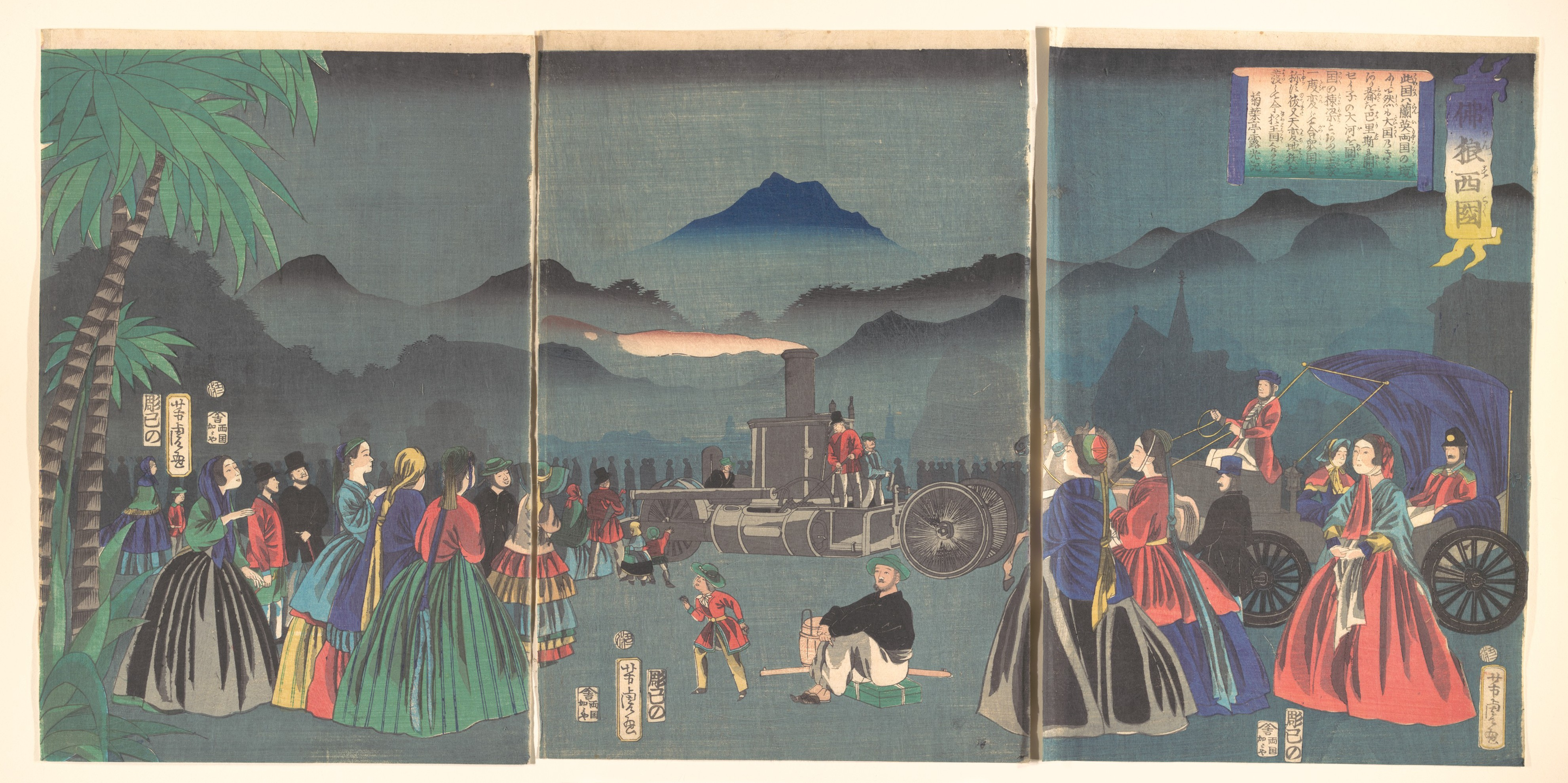
France, painted in 1865
