= Utagawa Kunisada II =

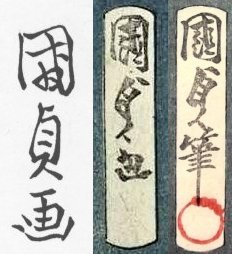
Signatures of Kunisada I (left) and Kunisada II (center and right)

Utagawa Kunisada II (歌川国貞, 1823 – 20 July 1880) was a Japanese ukiyo-e print designer, one of three to take the name "Utagawa Kunisada". He headed the Utagawa school.

== Life and career ==
Little is known of Kunisada II's early life. A pupil of Utagawa Kunisada I, he signed much of his early work "Kunimasa III". He was born in 1823 as Takenouchi Munehisa; before his marriage to Osuzu, he signed his prints as Baidō Kunimasa or Kunimasa III. His earliest known prints date to 1844. Kunisada I adopted him in 1846 after he married the master's daughter Osuzu. He took the name Kunisada II c. 1850–51, about the time he inherited the house of Kunisada I. He changed his name once more following his master's death, to Toyokuni III. However, since there were three artists called Toyokuni before him, Kunisada II is now often known as Toyokuni IV.

Kunisada II worked in the style of his master, but never achieved the same level of success. His prints include over 40 series, mostly of actors (yakusha-e), as well portraits of beauties, illustrations of scenes from literature, erotica, and other subjects. He illustrated nearly 200 books. One of his most celebrated actor series, "The Tale of the Eight Dog Heroes" (Hakkendun inu no sōshi no uchi), dating from 1852, is drawn from Kyokutei Bakin's epic novel, "The Satomi Clan and the Eight Dogs" (Nansō Satomi hakkenden), written from 1814 to 1842 and published in 106 volumes.

Among his notable Genji-e series, produced for the publisher Tsutaya Kichizō, were Murasaki Shikibu Genji karuta, Genji imayō emaki and Omokage Genji gojūyojō. After Japanese prints began reaching Europe in the late 1860s, his work attracted the attention of Western audiences, even though its use of bright aniline colours was seen as characteristic of an exaggerated late-ukiyo-e style.

Kunisada II's productivity waned in the Meiji period (1868–1912), and he appears to have stopped making prints after 1874. He died on 20 July 1880 and was buried at Banshōin Kōunji. His Buddhist posthumous name is Sankōin Hōkokujutei Shinji. Students of his include Kunisada III (1848–1920).

== Signatures ==
Kunisada II usually signed prints either 国貞画 (Kunisada ga, drawn by Kunisada) or 国貞筆 (Kunisada hitsu, from the brush of Kunisada). He did not sign prints "Kunisada II". His signature may be distinguished from that of Kunisada I in that the sada kanji is straight in the signature of Kunisada I, but angular in the signature of Kunisada II (see figure). Further, Kunisada I took the name 'Toyokuni' in 1844, and never included the 'Kunisada' signature within the Toshidama cartouche, as Kunisada II often does in the 1850s and 1860s. Moreover, most prints signed 'Kunisada' and by Kunisada II are datable by censor or date seals to post-1850.

Works by Kunisada II

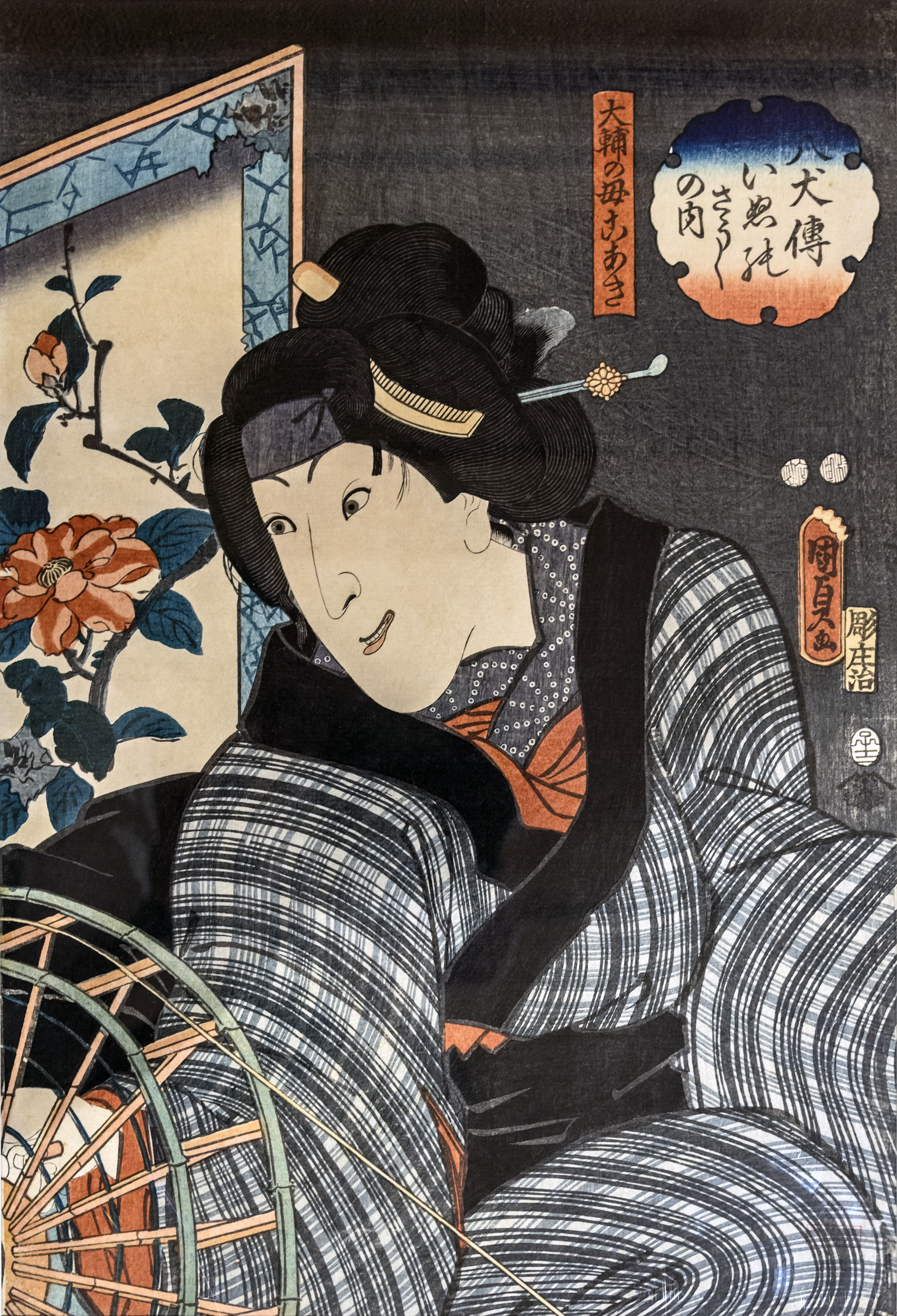

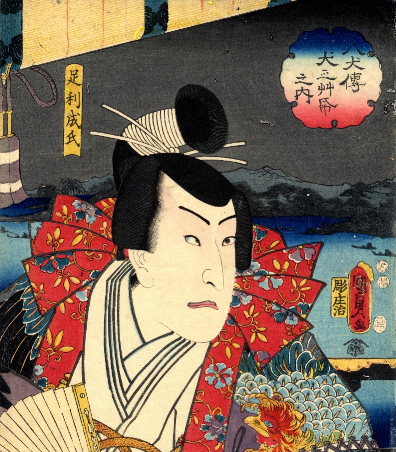

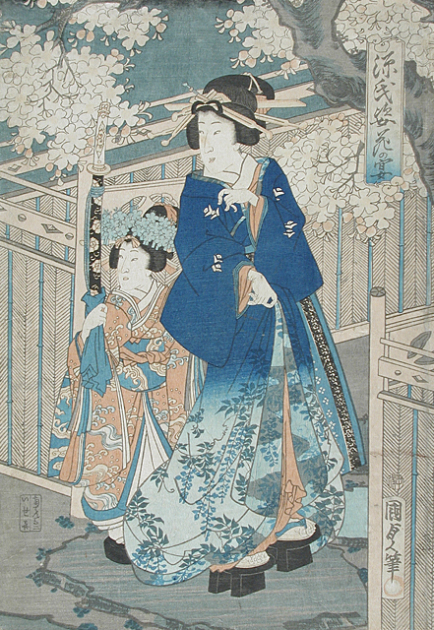

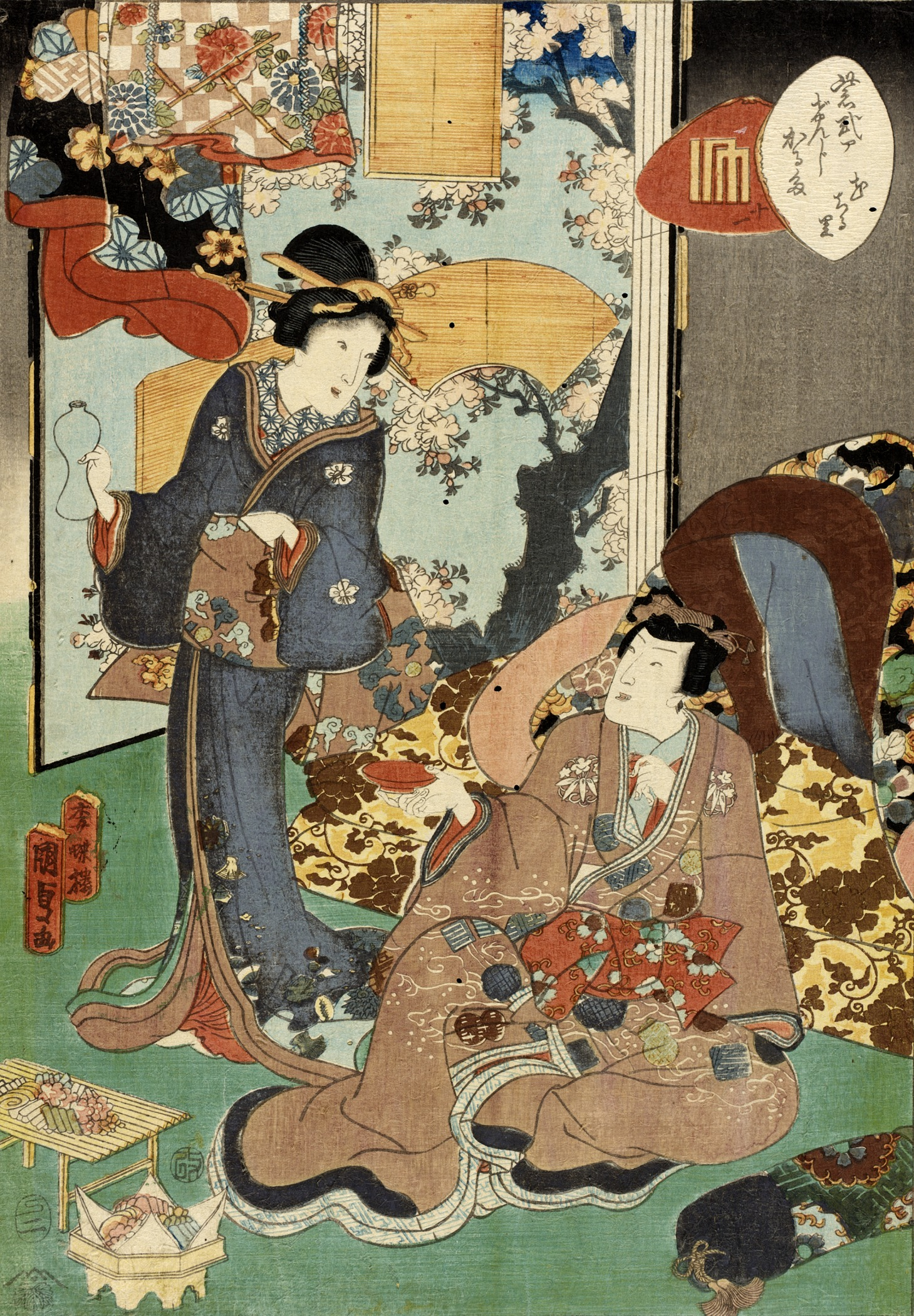

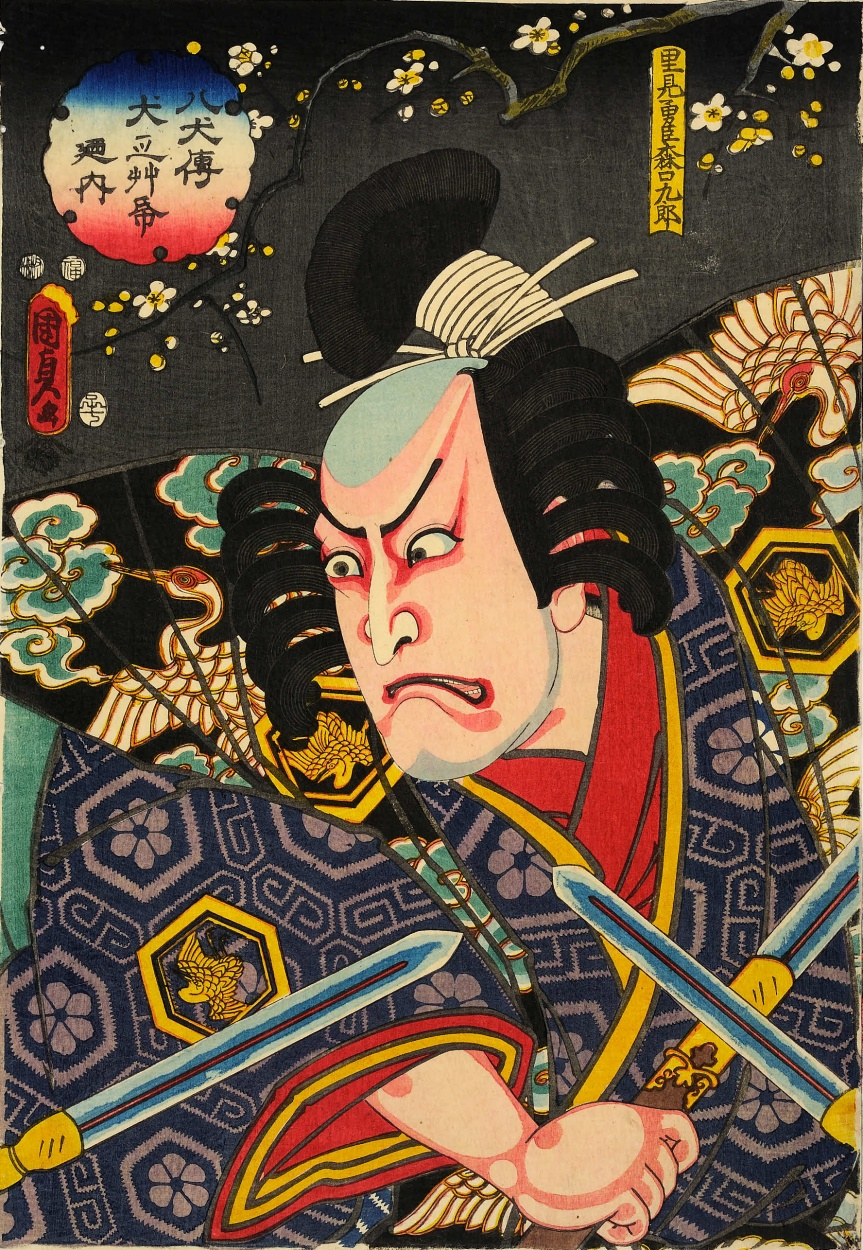

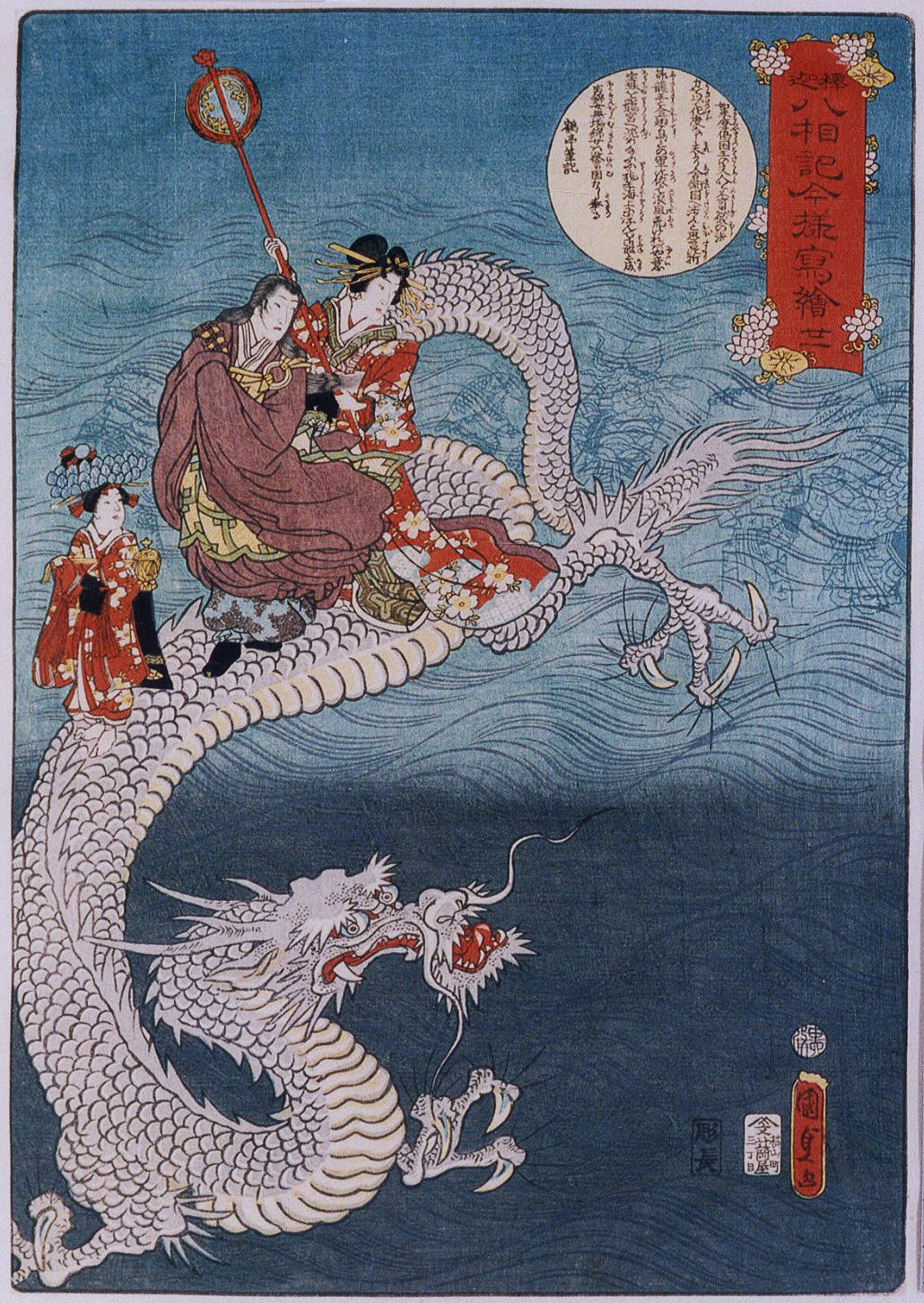

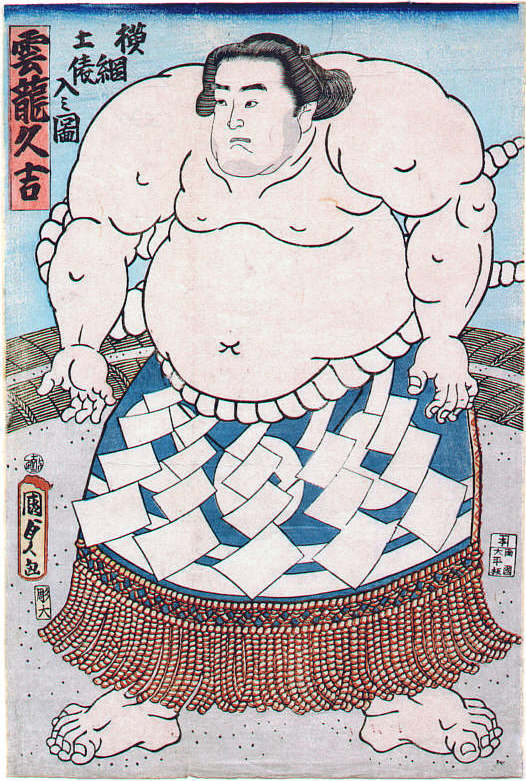

== See also ==
- Utagawa Kunisada III
