= Kunisada =

Japanese woodblock print artist (1786–1865)

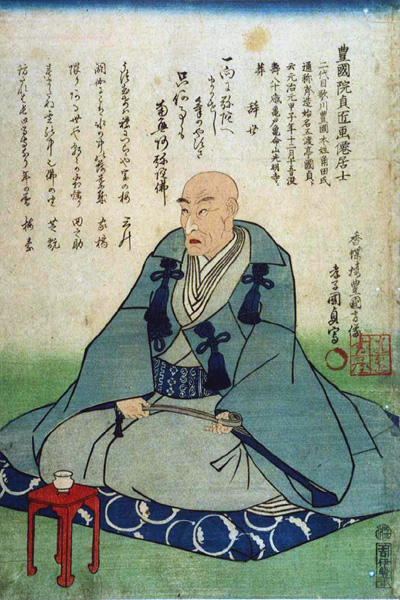
Woodblock print portrait of Utagawa Kunisada, at the age of 80 years, dated January 1865. This memorial portrait was designed by his principal student, Kunisada II, and is one of the few known images of Kunisada.

Utagawa Kunisada (Japanese: 歌川 国貞; 1786 – 12 January 1865), also known as Utagawa Toyokuni III (三代 歌川 豊国, Sandai Utagawa Toyokuni), was a Japanese ukiyo-e artist. He is considered the most popular, prolific and commercially successful designer of ukiyo-e woodblock prints in 19th-century Japan. In his own time, his reputation far exceeded that of his contemporaries Hokusai, Hiroshige and Kuniyoshi.

== Evaluation of Kunisada in art history ==
At the end of the Edo period (1603–1867), Hiroshige, Kuniyoshi and Kunisada were the three best representatives of the Japanese color woodcut in Edo (capital city of Japan, now Tokyo). However, among European and American collectors of Japanese prints, beginning in the late 19th and early 20th century, all three of these artists were actually regarded as rather inferior to the greats of classical ukiyo-e, and therefore as having contributed considerably to the downfall of their art. For this reason, some referred to their works as "decadent".

Beginning in the 1930s and 1970s, respectively, the works of Hiroshige and Kuniyoshi were submitted to a re-evaluation, and these two are now counted among the masters of their art. Thus, from Kunisada alone was withheld, for a long time, the acknowledgment which is due to him. With a few exceptions, such as actor portraits (yakusha-e) and portraits of beautiful women (bijin-ga), at the beginning of his career, and some series of large-size actor head-portraits near the end, it was thought that he had produced only inferior works. It was not until the early 1990s, with the appearance of Jan van Doesburg's overview of the artistic development of Kunisada, and Sebastian Izzard's extensive study of his work, that this picture began to change, with Kunisada more clearly revealed as one of the "giants" of the Japanese print that he was.

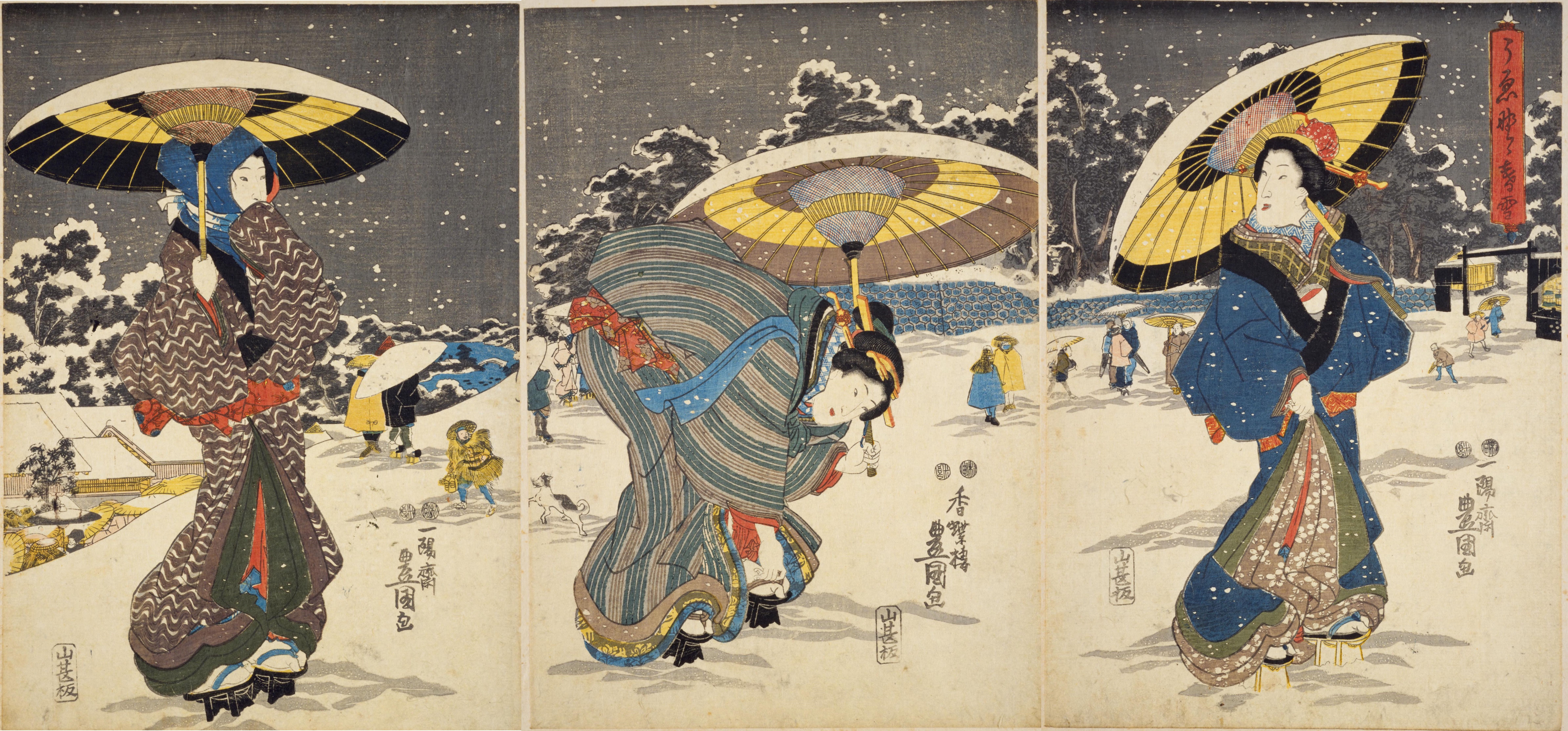
Twilight snowfall at Ueno, famous example of beauty portraits, c. 1850

== Biography ==
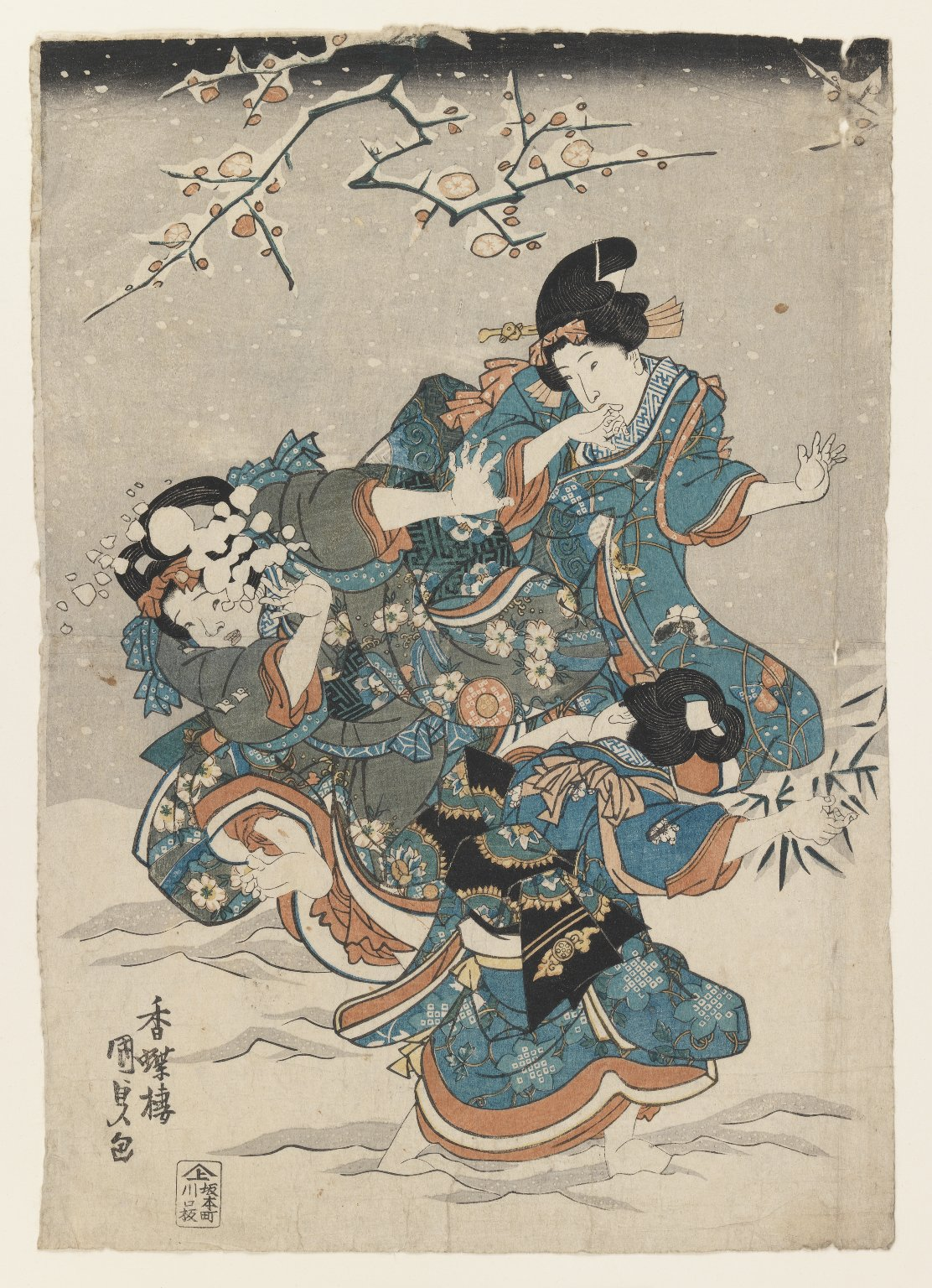
Snow Scene

Although not much is known of the details of Kunisada's life, there are some well-established records of particular events. He was born in 1786 in Honjo, an eastern district of Edo. His given name was Sumida Shōgorō IX (角田庄五朗), and he was also called Sumida Shōzō (角田庄蔵). A small licensed and hereditary ferry-boat service belonged to his family, and the income derived from this business provided a certain basic financial security to engage in leisure activities such as painting. The ferry service was located near the Gohyaku-Rakan temple in the Honjo district, on the banks of the Tate, a small tributary that joined the Sumida River a short distance south of the Ryōgoku Bridge. His father, who was an amateur poet of some renown, died in the year after his birth. While growing up, he developed an early talent for painting and drawing. His early sketches at that time impressed Toyokuni, the great master of the Utagawa school and prominent designer of kabuki and actor-portrait prints. In the year 1800 or shortly thereafter Kunisada was accepted by Toyokuni I as an apprentice in his workshop. In keeping with a tradition of Japanese master-apprentice relations, he was then given the official artist name of "KUNI-sada", the first character of which was derived from the second part of the name "Toyo-KUNI".

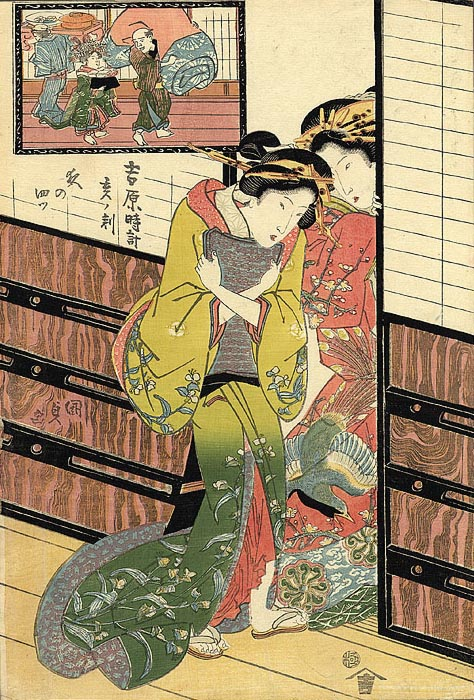
The Hours of the Yoshiwara, c. 1818, from a well-known early bijin-ga series by Kunisada

His first known print dates to the year 1807. However this seems to have been an exceptional design, and further full-sized prints appear starting only in 1809–1810. As of 1808 he had already begun work as an illustrator of e-hon (woodblock print illustrated books) and his popularity rapidly increased. In 1809 he was referred to in contemporary sources as the "star attraction" of the Utagawa school, and soon thereafter was considered as at least equal to his teacher Toyokuni in the area of book illustration. Kunisada's first actor portraits appeared in either 1808 or 1809. It is known that his first bijin-ga series and a series of pentaptychs of urban scenes of Edo, appear simultaneously in 1809. By 1813 he had risen as a "star" in the constellation of Edo's artistic world; a contemporary list of the most important ukiyo-e artists places him in second place behind Toyokuni I. Kunisada remained one of the "trendsetters" of the Japanese woodblock print until his death in early 1865.

Beginning around 1810 Kunisada used the studio name "Gototei", which refers cryptically to his father's ferry-boat business. Until 1842 this signature appeared on nearly all of his kabuki designs. Around 1825 the studio name "Kochoro" appeared, and was often used on prints not related to kabuki. This name was derived from a combination of the pseudonyms of master painter Hanabusa Itcho, and that of his successor Hanabusa Ikkei, with whom Kunisada had studied a new style of painting around 1824–1825. In 1844, he finally adopted the name of his master Toyokuni I, and for a brief time used the signature "Kunisada becoming Toyokuni II". Starting in 1844–1845, all of his prints are signed "Toyokuni", partially with the addition of other studio names as prefixes, such as "Kochoro" and "Ichiyosai". Although Kunisada referred to himself as "Toyokuni II", he must be regarded, however, as "Toyokuni III". The question is unsettled as to why he intentionally ignored Toyoshige, a pupil and son-in-law of Toyokuni I and who had borne the name "Toyokuni", as legitimate head of the Utagawa school, from 1825 until his own death in 1835. Towards the end of his life he began recording his age with his signature on his prints.

The date of Kunisada's death was the 15th day of the 12th month of the First Year of Genji. Most sources erroneously report this as having been in the year 1864, though this date in the Japanese calendar corresponds to the date January 12, 1865, in the Gregorian calendar. Kunisada died in the same neighborhood in which he had been born.

== Artistic activity ==
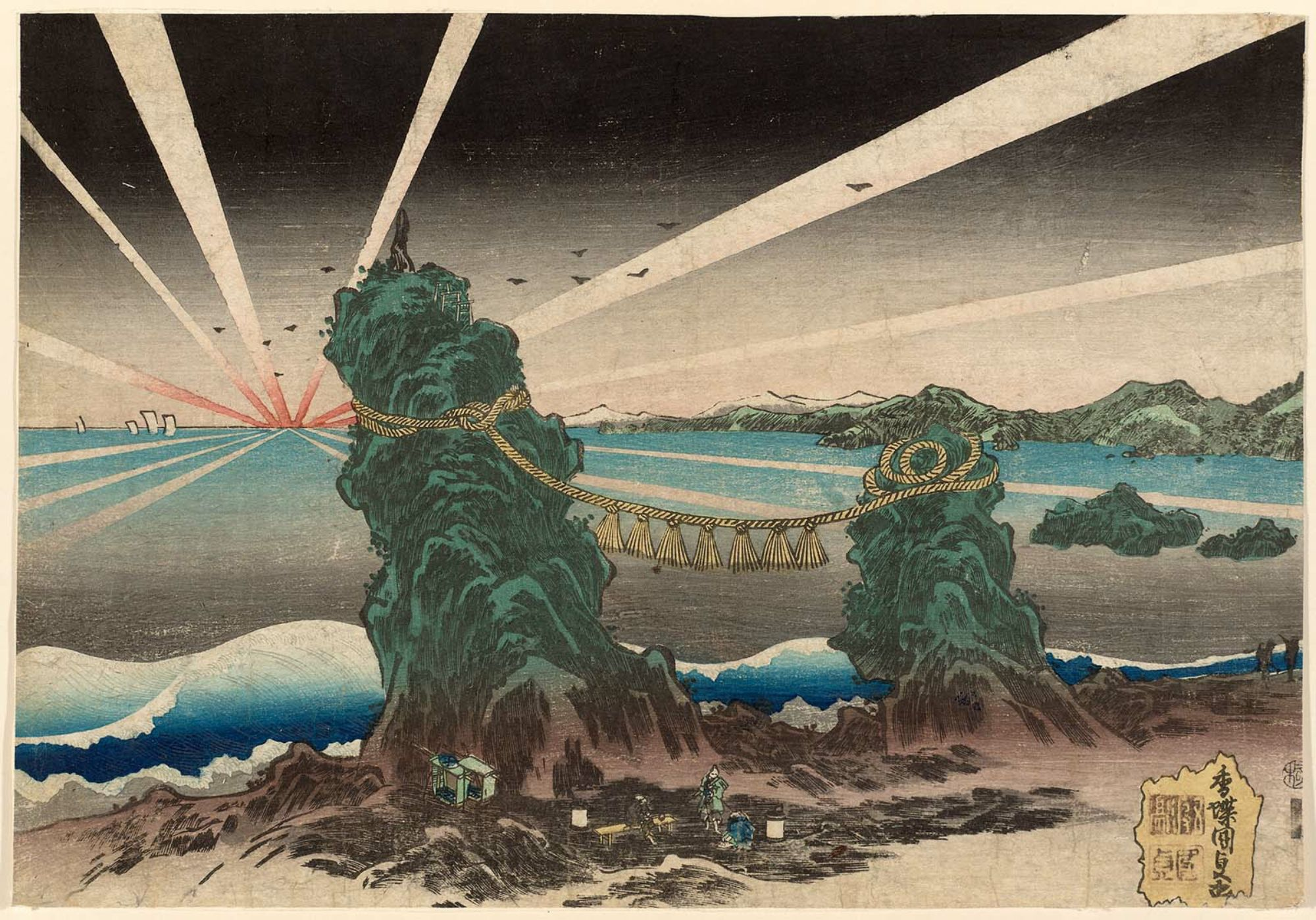
Dawn at Futamigaura, seascape print by Kunisada, c. 1830

Almost from the first day of his activity, and even at the time of his death in 1865, Kunisada was a trendsetter in the art of the Japanese woodblock print. Always at the vanguard of his time, and in tune with the tastes of the public, he continuously developed his style, which was sometimes radically changed, and did not adhere to stylistic constraints set by any of his contemporaries. His productivity was extraordinary. About 14,500 individual designs have been catalogued (polyptych sets counted as a single design) corresponding to more than 22,500 individual sheets. It seems probable based on these figures that Kunisada actually produced between 20,000 and 25,000 designs for woodblock prints during his lifetime (i.e. 35,000 to 40,000 individual sheets).

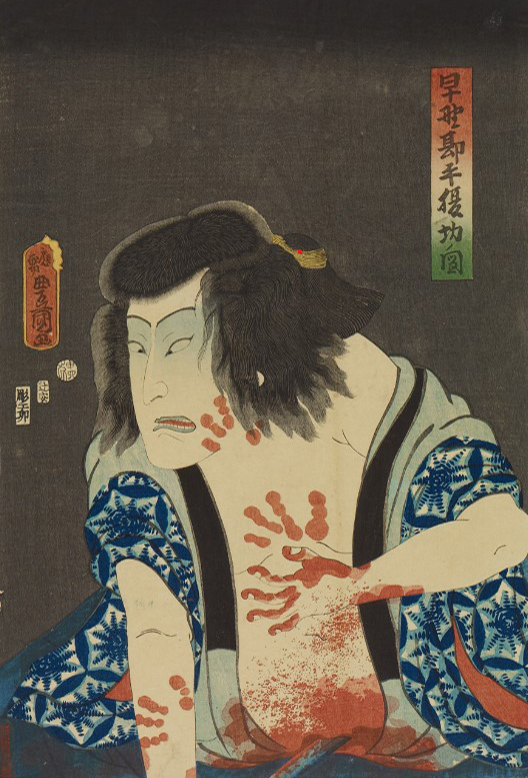
Kunisada portrait of Nakamura Fukusuke I as Hayano Kanpei

Following the traditional pattern of the Utagawa school, Kunisada's main occupation was kabuki and actor prints, and about 60% of his designs fall in this category. However he was also highly active in the area of bijin-ga prints (comprising about 15% of his complete works), and their total number was far higher than any other artist of his time. From 1820 to 1860 he likewise dominated the market for portraits of sumo wrestlers. For a long time (1835–1850) he had an almost complete monopoly on the genre of prints related to The Tale of Genji; it was only after 1850 that other artists began to produce similar designs. Noteworthy also are the number of his surimono, and although they were designed almost exclusively prior to 1844, few artists were better-known in this area.

Kunisada's paintings, which were privately commissioned, are little-known, but can be compared to those of other masters of ukiyoe painting. His activity as a book illustrator is also largely unexplored. He was no less productive in the area of ehon than he was in full-sized prints, and notable among his book prints are shunga pictures, which appeared in numerous books. Due to censorship, they are signed only on the title page with his alias "Matahei". Landscape prints and musha-e (samurai warrior prints) by Kunisada are rare, and only about 100 designs in each of these genres are known. He effectively left these two fields to be covered by his contemporaries Hiroshige and Kuniyoshi, respectively.

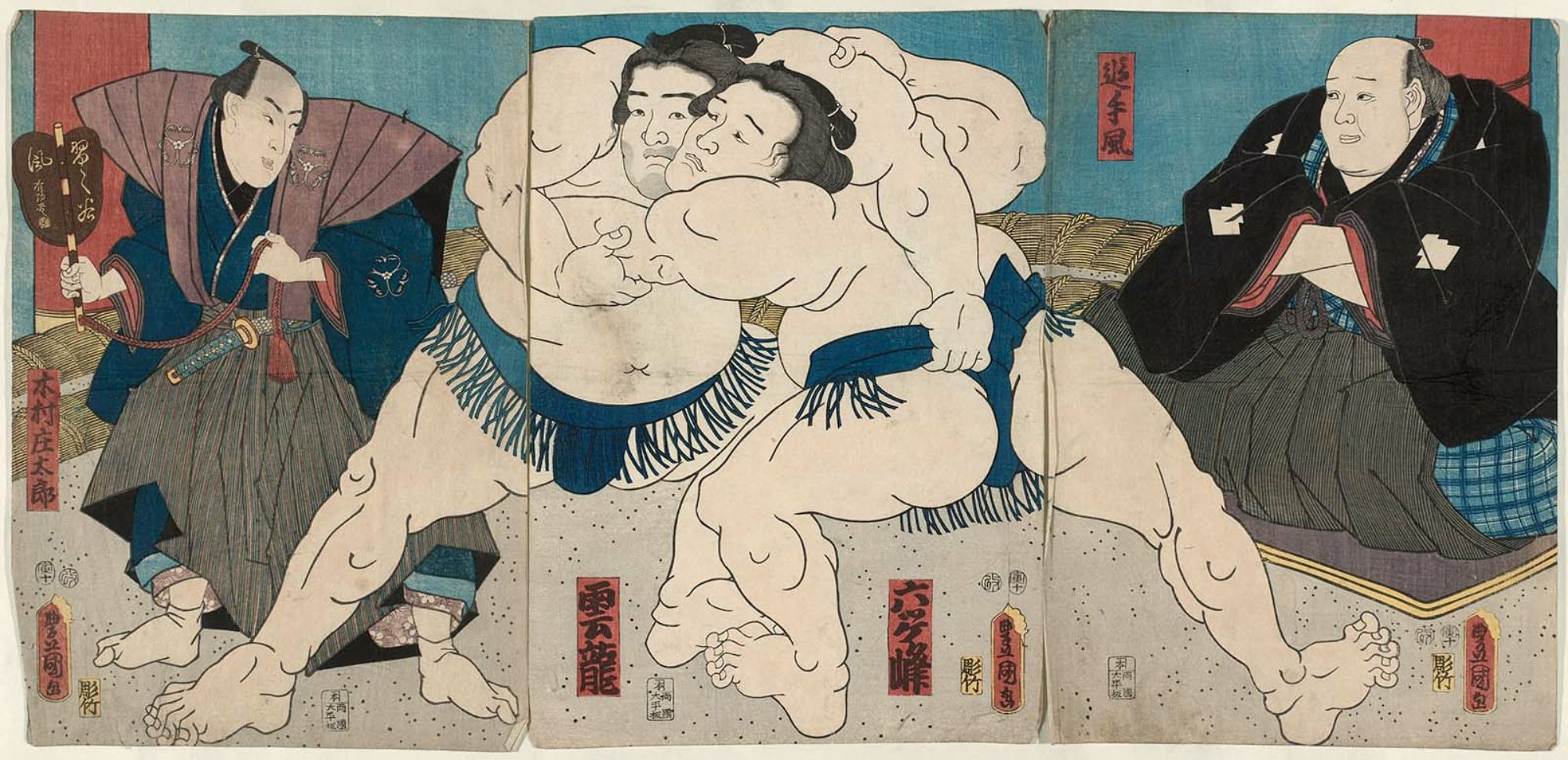
Sumo wrestling scene, triptych set of three prints by Kunisada, c. 1851

The mid-1840s and early 1850s, were a period of expansion when woodblock prints were in high demand in Japan. During this time Kunisada collaborated with one of or both Hiroshige and Kuniyoshi in three major series as well as on a number of smaller projects. This co-operation was in large part politically motivated in order to demonstrate solidarity against the intensified censorship regulations of the Tenpō Reforms. Also beginning around the mid-1850s there are series in which individual parts of designs (and sometimes complete sheets) are signed by Kunisada's students; this was done with the intention of promoting their work as individual artists. Notable students of Kunisada included Toyohara Kunichika, Utagawa Sadahide and Utagawa Kunisada II. The majority of Kunisada's work was of actors portrayed in current popular plays; most of the rest was of women in the latest fashions. The works dated with quickly-changing fashions, and there was a constant demand for new prints to replace the outdated ones.

== Reception and legacy ==
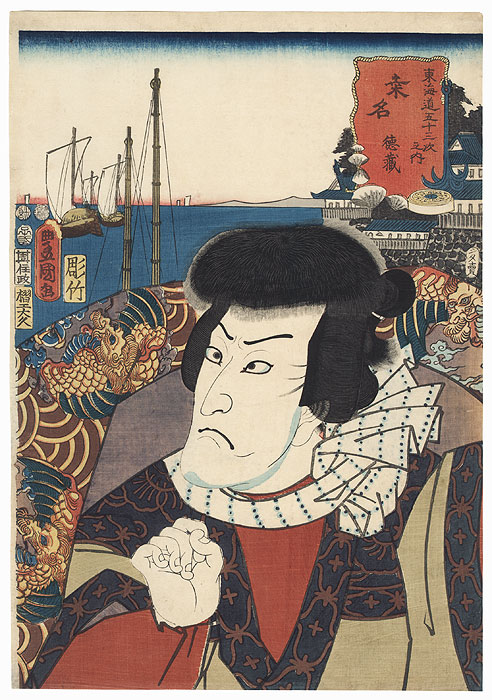
The Fifty-three Stations of the Tokaido woodblock print portrait of kabuki actor Onoe Kikugoro III in the role of Tokuzo by Kunisada, c.1852

Kunisada had a five-decade career, during which his work was popular and sold in the thousands, letting him become the bestselling designer of Japanese woodblock prints. A well-known anecdote recorded in Biographies of the Utagawa School Artists by Iijima Kyoshin, written beginning of the 1890s, relates that the young Kuniyoshi, having languished for years as an artist, once observed Kunisada, ten years older and already a popular artist, dressed in rich clothes and enjoying himself with a geisha along the roads in Edo. Spurred by envy, Kuniyoshi vowed to renew devotion to his art and later achieved success. Kunisada was so famous that, in order to help his friend Hiroshige promote the first edition of the Tokaido, he designed his own series of The fifty-three stations of the Tokaido, adding a half-length figure to the foreground of each of Hiroshige's landscapes.

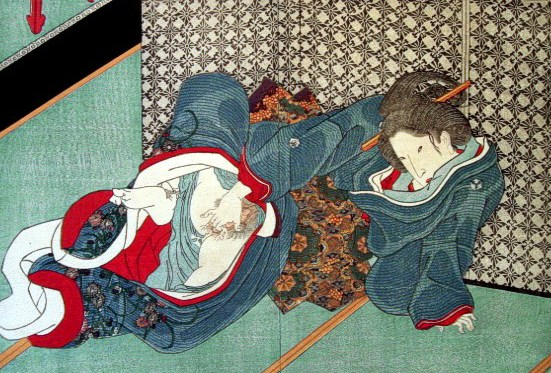
"Shunga" erotic print by Kunisada

Early 20th-century critics have been reluctant to declare merit in his work, particularly of the later period. An example of the contempt early Western critics subjected Kunisada's work to:

This very undistinguished artist was one of the most prolific of the ukiyo-e school. All that meaningless complexity of design, coarseness of colour, and carelessness of printing which we associate with the final ruin of the art of colour-prints finds full expression with him.

— Arthur Davison Ficke, Chats on Japanese Prints (1915)

It is only with the 1990s that Kunisada's work re-gained widespread appreciation. Nowadays, Kunisada is again well-regarded as one of the main masters of the ukiyo-e art:

Kunisada became a leading artist of the ukiyo-e school at an early age thanks to his amazing skill in capturing the likeliness of kabuki actors, creating must-have souvenirs for their legions of fans.

— Sarah E. Thompson, Kuniyoshi x Kunisada, MFA Publications, Boston, 2017

Accurately portraying women of different ages and occupations, from Yoshiwara courtesans to daughters of middle-class families, he allows us to sense their inner world through their lively facial expressions, in pictures of convincing realism.

— Masato Matsushima, Kuniyoshi x Kunisada, MFA Publications, Boston, 2017

== Collections ==
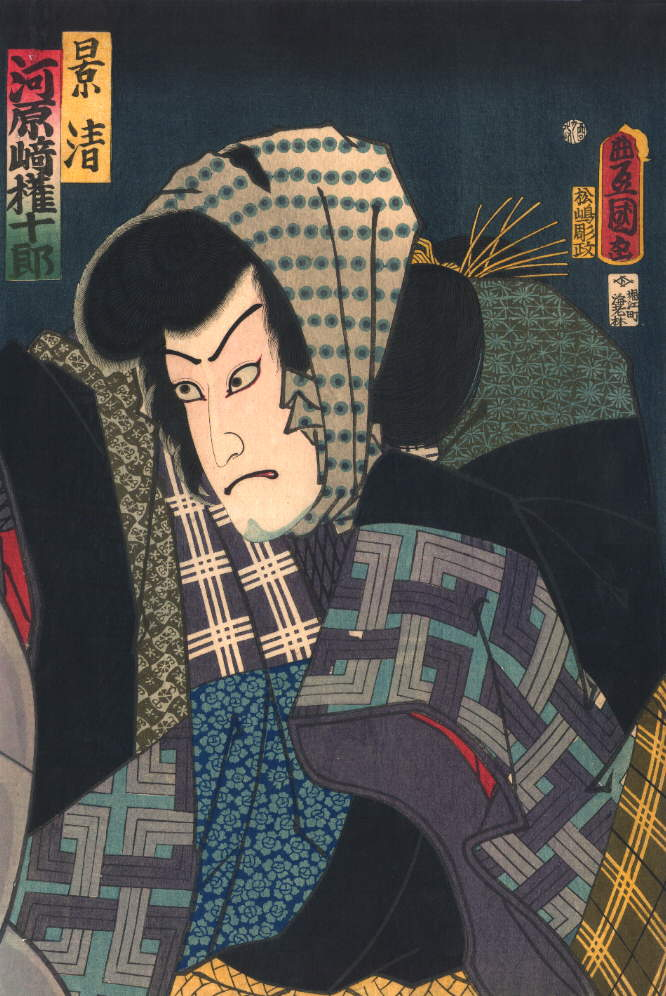
Kunisada portrait of kabuki actor Kawarazaki Gonjuro I (1861)

Recent Exhibits:

- A Third Gender, Royal Ontario Museum & Japan Society, 2017
- Showdown!, MFA Boston, 2016
- Utagawa, Brooklyn Museum of Art, 2008
- Living for the Moment: Japanese Prints from the Collection of Barbara S. Bowman, LACMA, 2006

Featured in Major Collections:

- British Museum
- Evansville Museum of Arts, History and Science
- Minneapolis Institute of Art
- Metropolitan Museum of Art
- Museum of Fine Arts, Boston
- Los Angeles County Museum of Art
- University of California, Berkeley
- Vanderbilt University Fine Arts Gallery

== See also ==
- Utagawa school
- List of Utagawa school members
