= Goshaku Somegoro =

Japanese fictional hero

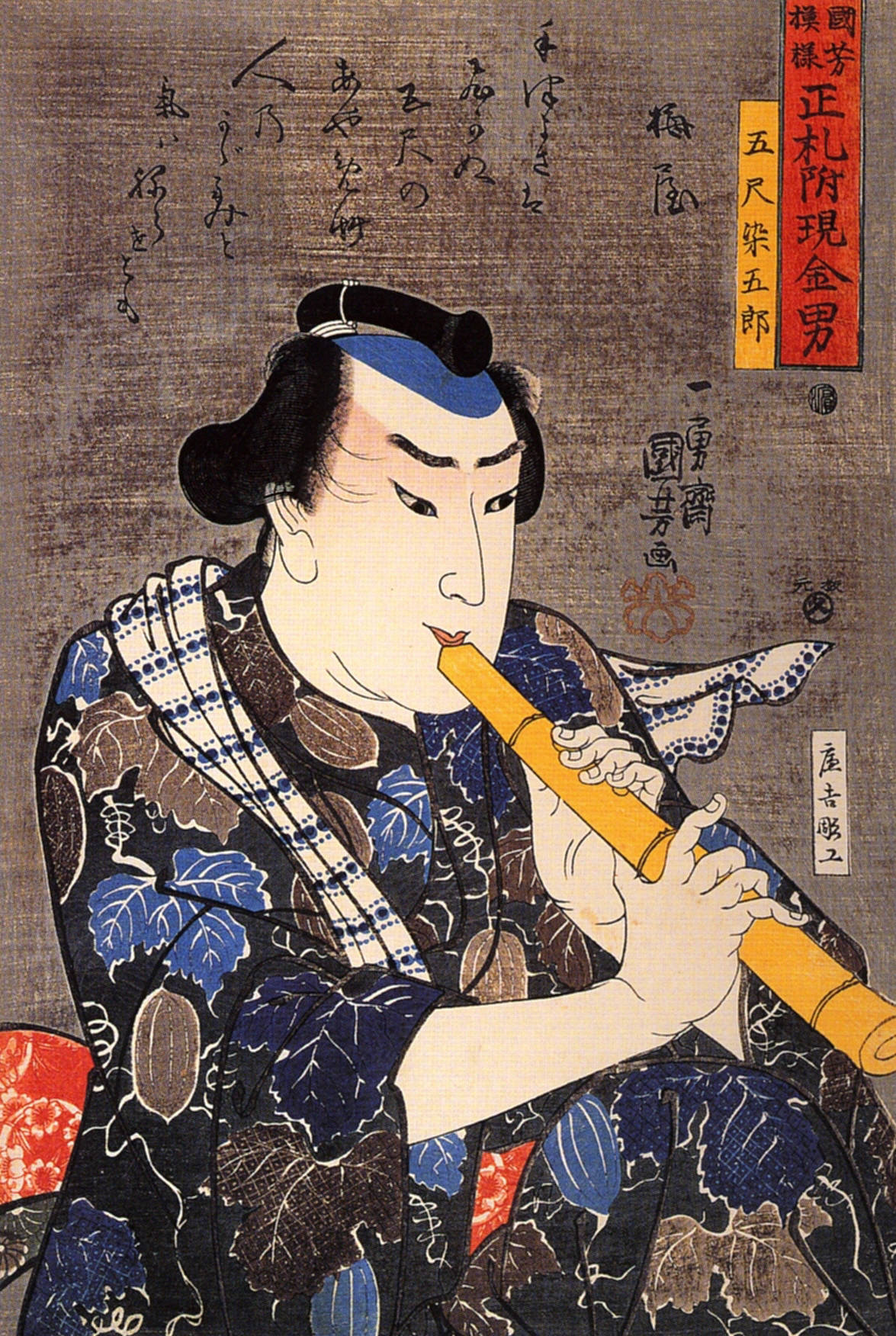
Woodblock print of Goshaku Somegoro playing shakuhachi, by Utagawa Kuniyoshi

Goshaku Somegoro (ja:五尺染五郎) is a fictional hero made popular in Japanese kabuki theatre in the play Koi moyô furisode myoto (ja: 恋模様振袖妹背).

== Plays ==
- Shochikubai
- Ume no haru gojusan tsugi
