= Yoshikazu =

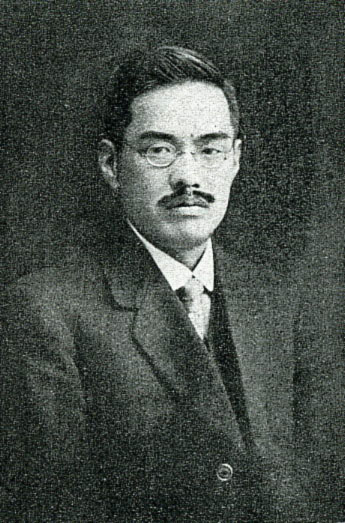
- Yoshikazu Uchida (1885–1972), Japanese architect and structural engineer
- Pronunciation: joɕikadzɯ (IPA)
- Gender: Male

Origin
- Origin: Japanese
- Meaning: Different meanings depending on the kanji used

Other names
- Alternative spelling: Yosikazu (Kunrei-shiki) Yosikazu (Nihon-shiki) Yoshikazu (Hepburn)

Yoshikazu is a masculine Japanese given name.

== Written forms ==
Yoshikazu can be written using different combinations of kanji characters. Here are some examples:

- 義一, "justice, 1"
- 義和, "justice, harmony"
- 吉一, "good luck, 1"
- 吉和, "good luck, harmony"
- 善一, "virtuous, 1"
- 善和, "virtuous, harmony"
- 芳一, "virtuous/fragrant, 1"
- 芳和, "virtuous/fragrant, harmony"
- 良一, "good, 1"
- 良和, "good, harmony"
- 喜和, "rejoice, harmony"
- 慶和, "congratulate, harmony"
- 能一, "capacity, 1"
- 嘉一, "excellent, 1"

The name can also be written in hiragana よしかず or katakana ヨシカズ.

== Notable people with the name ==
- Yoshikazu Ashikaga (足利 義量; 1407–1425), Japanese shōgun
- Yoshikazu Cho (長 義和; born 1953), Japanese cyclist
- Yoshikazu Fujita (藤田 慶和; born 1993), Japanese rugby union player
- Yoshikazu Fukumura (福村 芳一; born 1946), Japanese conductor
- Yoshikazu Goto (後藤 義一; born 1964), Japanese footballer and manager
- Yoshikazu Higashitani (東谷 義和; born 1971), Japanese YouTuber and politician
- Yoshikazu Hiki (比企 能員; died 1203), Japanese warrior
- Yoshikazu Isoda (礒田 由和; born 1965), Japanese footballer
- Yoshikazu Iwamoto (岩本 由和, born 1945), Japanese musician
- Yoshikazu Katō (加藤 義一; born 1972), Japanese film director and screenwriter
- Yoshikazu Kawaguchi (川口 由一; born 1939), Japanese farmer, writer and educator
- Yoshikazu Kotani (小谷 嘉一; born 1982), Japanese actor and singer
- Yoshikazu Mera (米良 美一; born 1971), Japanese singer
- Yoshikazu Minami (photographer) (南 良和; born 1935), Japanese photographer
- Yoshikazu Minami (shogi) (南 芳一; born 1963), Japanese shogi player
- Yoshikazu Nagai (永井 良和; born 1952), Japanese footballer and manager
- Yoshikazu Nonomura (野々村 芳和; born 1972), Japanese footballer
- Yoshikazu Okada (岡田 良一; 1901–1974), Japanese religious leader
- Yoshikazu Sakai (酒井 喜和), Japanese Paralympic swimmer
- Yoshikazu Shirakawa (白川 義員; born 1935), Japanese photographer
- Yoshikazu Suo (周防 義和; born 1953), Japanese musician
- Yoshikazu Suzuki (鈴木 良和; born 1982), Japanese footballer
- Yoshikazu Takeuchi (竹内 義和; born 1955), Japanese writer
- Yoshikazu Tanaka (田中 良和; born 1977), Japanese businessman
- Yoshikazu Taru (多留 嘉一; born 1964), Japanese professional wrestler
- Yoshikazu Uchida (内田 祥三; 1885–1972), Japanese architect and structural engineer
- Yoshikazu Washuyama (鷲羽山 佳和; born 1949), Japanese sumo wrestler
- Yoshikazu Yahiro (八尋 義和; born 1970), Japanese guitarist
- Yoshikazu Yokoshima (横島 由一, born 1952), Japanese golfer
- Yoshikazu Yasuhiko (安彦 良和; born 1947), Japanese animator and manga artist

== See also ==
- 8102 Yoshikazu, a main-belt asteroid
