= Hiroshige =

Japanese ukiyo-e woodblock print artist

- 広重
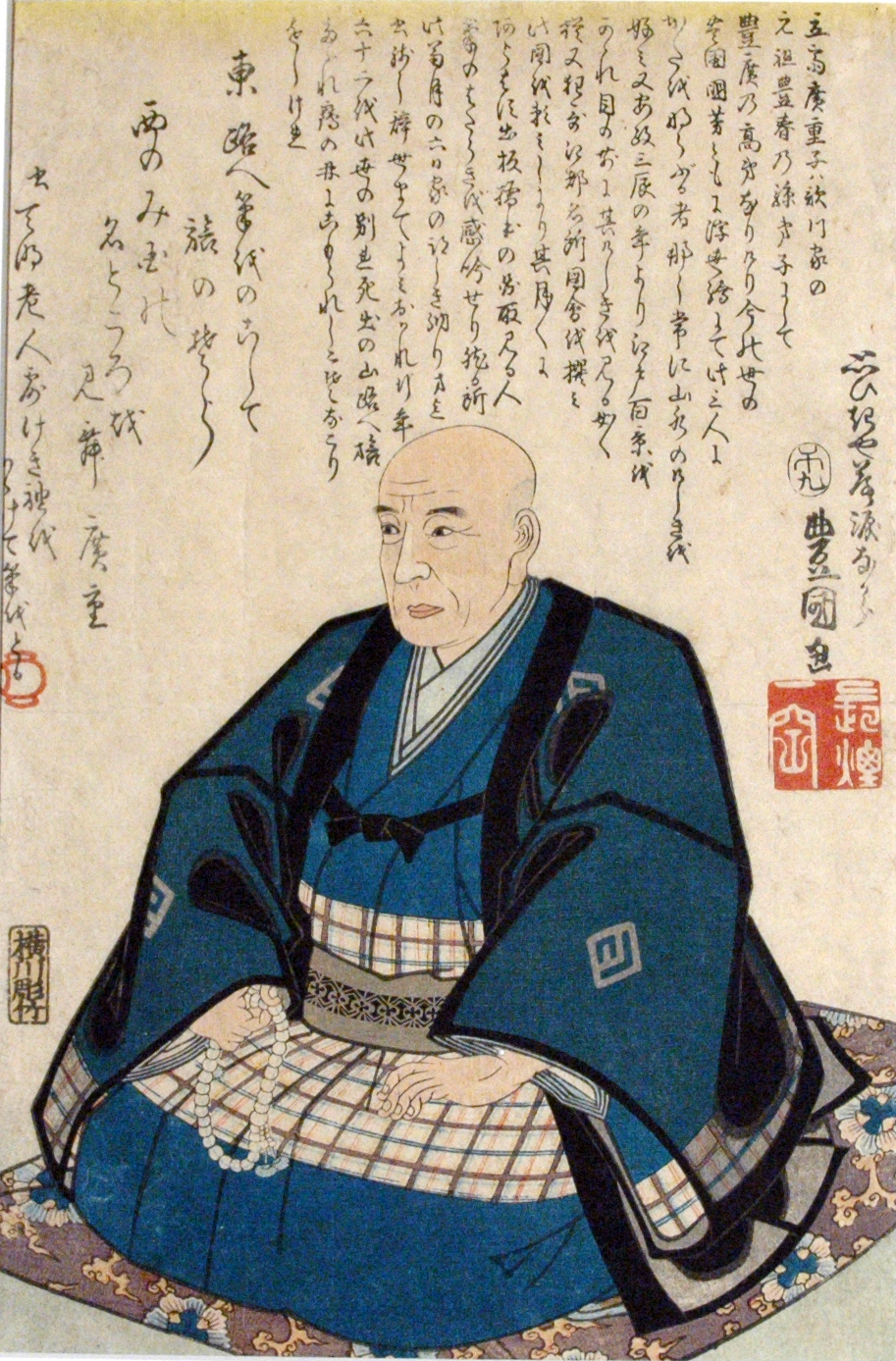
- Memorial portrait of Hiroshige by Kunisada, 1858
- Born: Andō Tokutarō; 1797; Edo, Japan
- Died: 12 October 1858 (aged 60–61); Edo, Japan
- Education: Toyohiro
- Known for: Painting; Printing
- Notable work: The Fifty-three Stations of the Tōkaidō; The Sixty-nine Stations of the Kiso Kaidō; Famous Views of the Sixty-odd Provinces; One Hundred Famous Views of Edo
- Movement: Utagawa school

Utagawa Hiroshige (Note: English: /ˌhɪəroʊˈʃiːɡeɪ/, also US: /ˌhɪərəˈ-/; Japanese: [ɯ̈̀.tä́.ɡä́.β̞ä́ | çì.ɾó̞.ɕì.ɡè̞, -β̞ä́ çí-, -ŋä́.β̞ä́, -ɕì.ŋè̞, -ɕí.ɡé̞, -ɕí.ŋé̞]) (歌川 広重) or Andō Hiroshige (Note: Japanese: [ä́ǹ.dò̞ò̞ | çì.ꜜɾó̞.ɕì.ɡè̞, -dò̞ò̞ | çì.ꜜɾó̞.ɕì.ŋè̞, ä́ǹ.dò̞ò̞ | çì.ꜜɾó̞.ɕí.ɡé̞, -dò̞ò̞ | çì.ꜜɾó̞.ɕí.ŋé̞, -dò̞ò̞ çì.ɾò̞.ɕì.ɡè̞, -dò̞ò̞ çì.ɾò̞.ɕì.ŋè̞]) (安藤 広重), born Andō Tokutarō (安藤 徳太郎; 1797 – 12 October 1858), was a Japanese ukiyo-e artist, considered the last great master of that tradition.

Hiroshige is best known for his horizontal-format landscape series The Fifty-three Stations of the Tōkaidō and for his vertical-format landscape series One Hundred Famous Views of Edo. The subjects of his work were atypical of the ukiyo-e genre, whose typical focus was on beautiful women, popular actors, and other scenes of the urban pleasure districts of Japan's Edo period (1603–1868). The popular series Thirty-six Views of Mount Fuji by Hokusai was a strong influence on Hiroshige's choice of subject, though Hiroshige's approach was more poetic and ambient than Hokusai's bolder, more formal prints. Subtle use of color was essential in Hiroshige's prints, often printed with multiple impressions in the same area and with extensive use of bokashi (color gradation), both of which were rather labor-intensive techniques.

For scholars and collectors, Hiroshige's death marked the beginning of a rapid decline in the ukiyo-e genre, especially in the face of the westernization that followed the Meiji Restoration of 1868. Hiroshige's work came to have a marked influence on western European painting towards the close of the 19th century as a part of the trend in Japonism. Western European artists, such as Manet and Monet, collected and closely studied Hiroshige's compositions: Vincent van Gogh, for instance, painted copies of some Hiroshige prints.

== Early life and apprenticeship ==
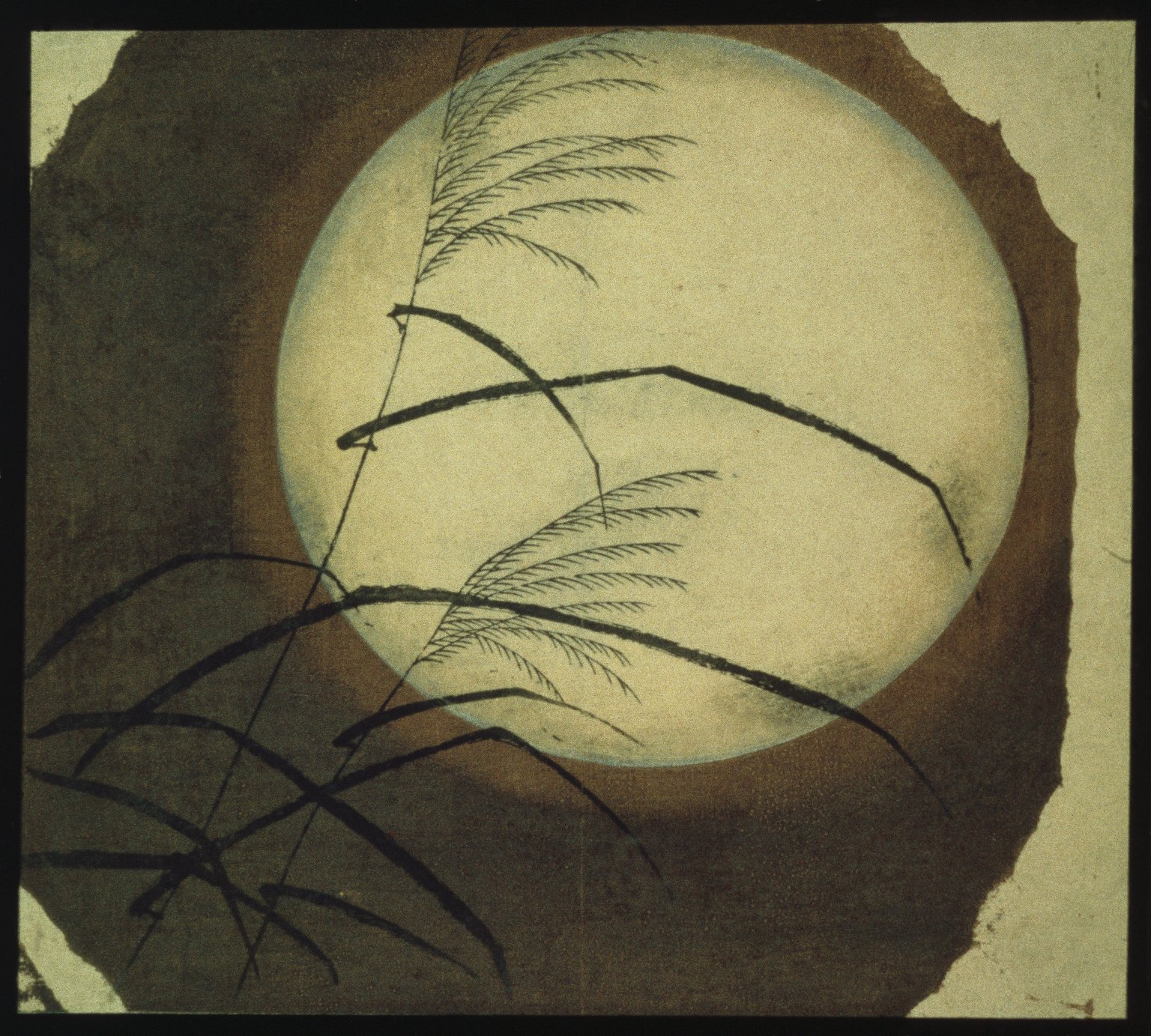
Wind Blown Grass Across the Moon, by Hiroshige, probably around 1832

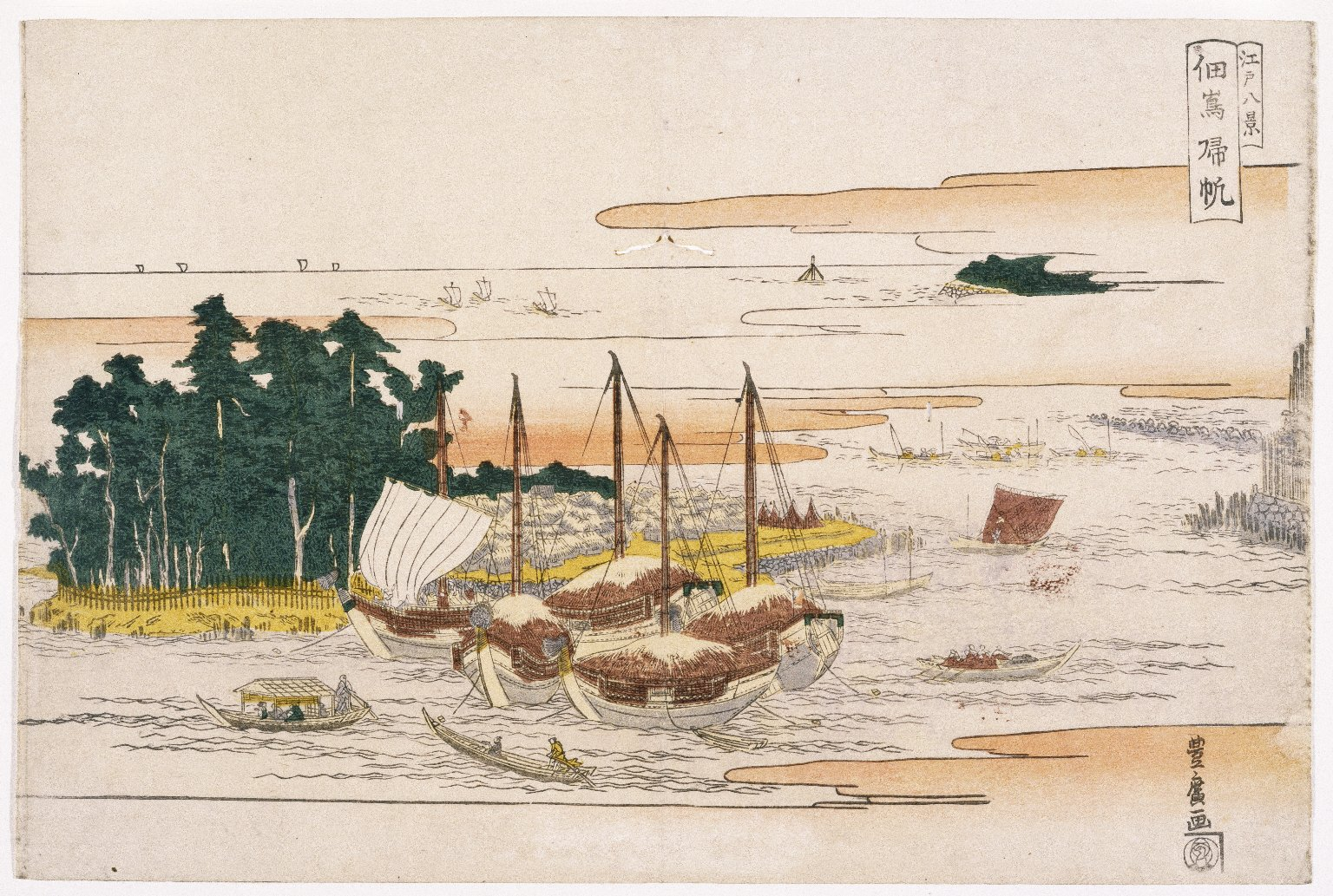
Hiroshige studied under Toyohiro of the Utagawa school of artists. Returning Sails at Tsukuda by Toyohiro, from Eight Views of Edo, between 1802 and 1829

Hiroshige was born in 1797 in the Yayosu Quay section of the Yaesu area in Edo (modern Tokyo). He was of a samurai background, and is the great-grandson of Tanaka Tokuemon, who held a position of power under the Tsugaru clan in the northern province of Mutsu. Hiroshige's grandfather, Mitsuemon, was an archery instructor who worked under the name Sairyūken. Hiroshige's father, Gen'emon, was adopted into the family of Andō Jūemon, whom he succeeded as fire warden for the Yayosu Quay area.

Hiroshige went through several name changes as a youth: Jūemon, Tokubē, and Tetsuzō. He had three sisters, one of whom died when he was three. His mother died in early 1809, and his father followed later in the year, but not before handing his fire warden duties to his twelve-year-old son. He was charged with prevention of fires at Edo Castle, a duty that left him much leisure time.

Not long after his parents' deaths, perhaps at around fourteen, Hiroshige—then named Tokutarō— began painting. At around the age of ten, Hiroshige studied traditional Kanō-style painting under Okajima Rinsai, who also lived in the fire warden barracks; according to some sources, in 1806 the young Hiroshige produced an emaki handscroll as a tribute to the governor of Edo, commissioned by an ambassador from the Ryukyu Islands. He sought the tutelage of Toyokuni of the Utagawa school, but Toyokuni had too many pupils to make room for him. A librarian introduced him instead to Toyohiro of the same school. By 1812 Hiroshige was permitted to sign his works, which he did under the art name Hiroshige. He also studied the techniques of the well-established Kanō school, the nanga whose tradition began with the Chinese Southern School, and the realistic Shijō school, and likely the linear perspective techniques of Western art and uki-e.

Hiroshige's apprentice work included book illustrations and single-sheet ukiyo-e prints of female beauties and kabuki actors in the Utagawa style, sometimes signing them Ichiyūsai or, from 1832, Ichiryūsai. In 1823, he passed his post as fire warden on to his son, though he still acted as an alternate. (Note: Hiroshige's resignation has led to conjecture: nominally, he passed the position to his son Nakajirō, but it may have been that Nakajirō was actually the son of his adoptive grandfather. Hiroshige, as adopted heir, may have been made to give up the position to the purported legitimate heir.) He declined an offer to succeed Toyohiro upon the master's death in 1828.

== Landscapes, flora, and fauna ==
It was not until 1829–1830 that Hiroshige began to produce the landscapes he has come to be known for, such as the Eight Views of Ōmi series. He also created an increasing number of bird and flower prints about this time. About 1831, his Ten Famous Places in the Eastern Capital appeared, and seem to bear the influence of Hokusai, whose popular landscape series Thirty-six Views of Mount Fuji had recently seen publication.

An invitation to join an official procession to Kyoto in 1832 gave Hiroshige the opportunity to travel along the Tōkaidō route that linked the two capitals. As a hikeishi-dōshin fire warden, Hiroshige was entitled to certain minor privileges reserved for low-ranking samurai, which is how he came to secure an invitation to join the procession. He sketched the scenery along the way, and when he returned to Edo he produced the series The Fifty-three Stations of the Tōkaidō, which contains some of his best-known prints. Hiroshige built on the series' success by following it with others, such as the Illustrated Places of Naniwa (1834), Famous Places of Kyoto (1835), another Eight Views of Ōmi (1834). As he had never been west of Kyoto, Hiroshige-based his illustrations of Naniwa (modern Osaka) and Ōmi Province (modern Shiga Prefecture) on pictures found in books and paintings.

Selections from The Fifty-three Stations of the Tōkaidō

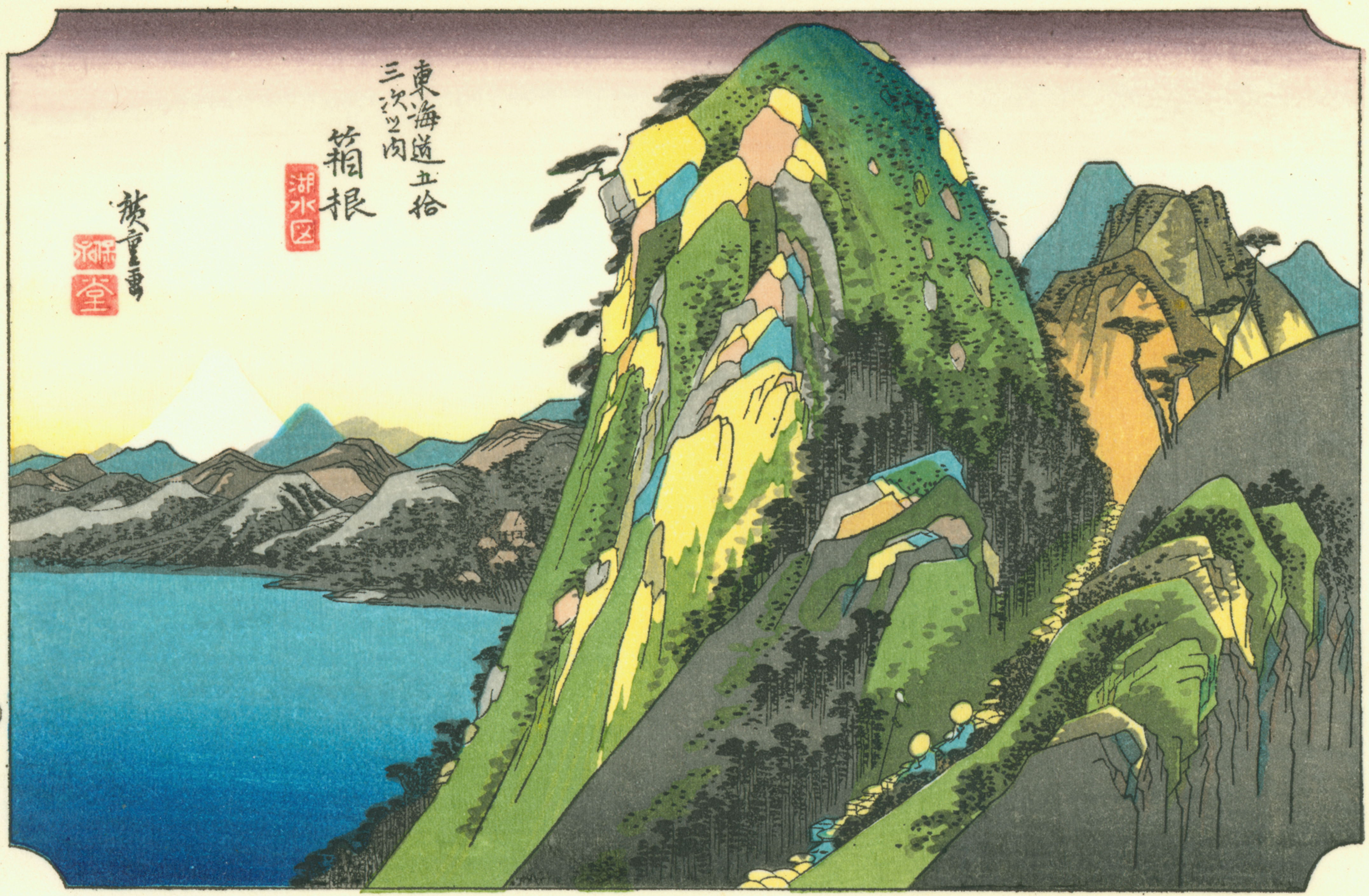
Print 11: Hakone

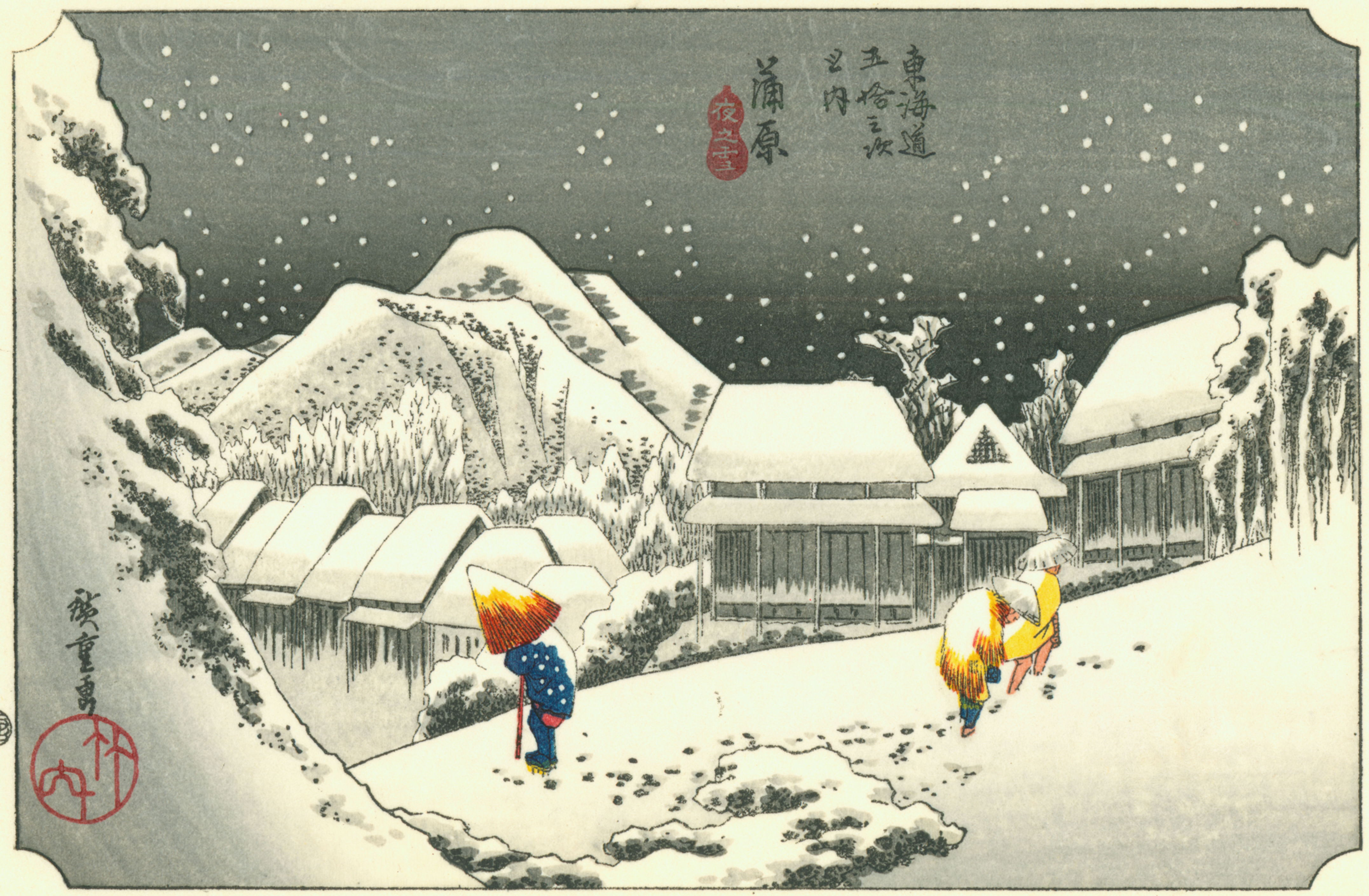
Print 16: Kanbara

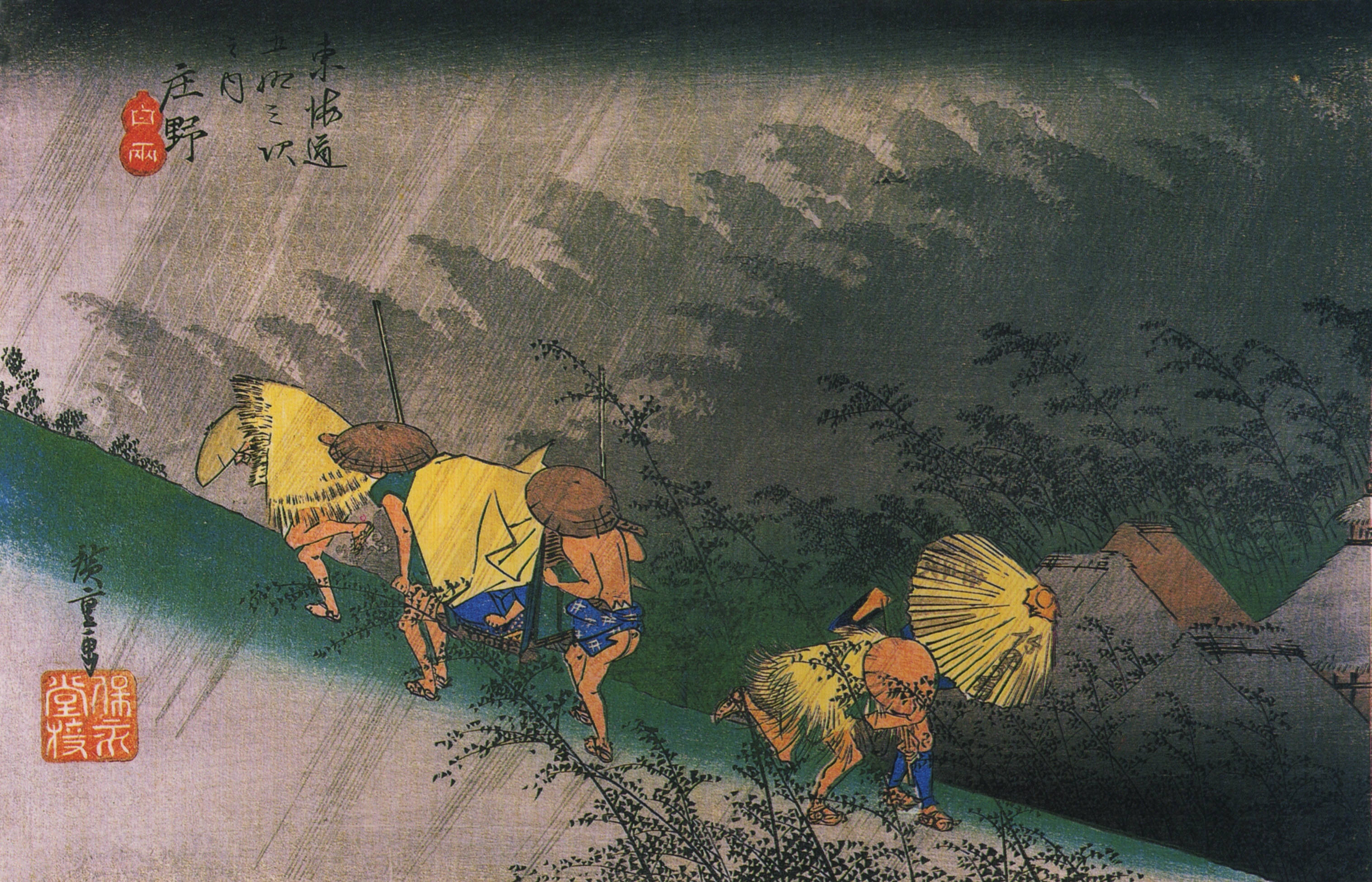
Print 46: Rain Shower at Shōno

Hiroshige's first wife helped finance his trips to sketch travel locations, in one instance selling some of her clothing and ornamental combs. She died in October 1838, and Hiroshige remarried to Oyasu, (Note: When Hiroshige and Oyasu married is not known.) sixteen years his junior, daughter of a farmer named Kaemon from Tōtōmi Province (modern Western Shizuoka prefecture).

Around 1838 Hiroshige produced two series entitled Eight Views of the Edo Environs, each print accompanied by a humorous kyōka poem. The Sixty-nine Stations of the Kisokaidō saw print between about 1835 and 1842, a joint production with Keisai Eisen, of which Hiroshige's share was forty-six of the seventy prints. The Sixty-nine Stations of the Kisokaidō was issued jointly by Takenouchi and Iseya Rihei. Hiroshige produced 118 sheets for the One Hundred Famous Views of Edo over the last decade of his life, beginning about 1848. In One Hundred Famous Views of Edo Hiroshige frequently places large-scale objects, people and animals, or parts of them, in the foreground. This device, derived from Western art, was intended to add depth to the composition.

Selections from One Hundred Famous Views of Edo and Thirty-six Views of Mount Fuji

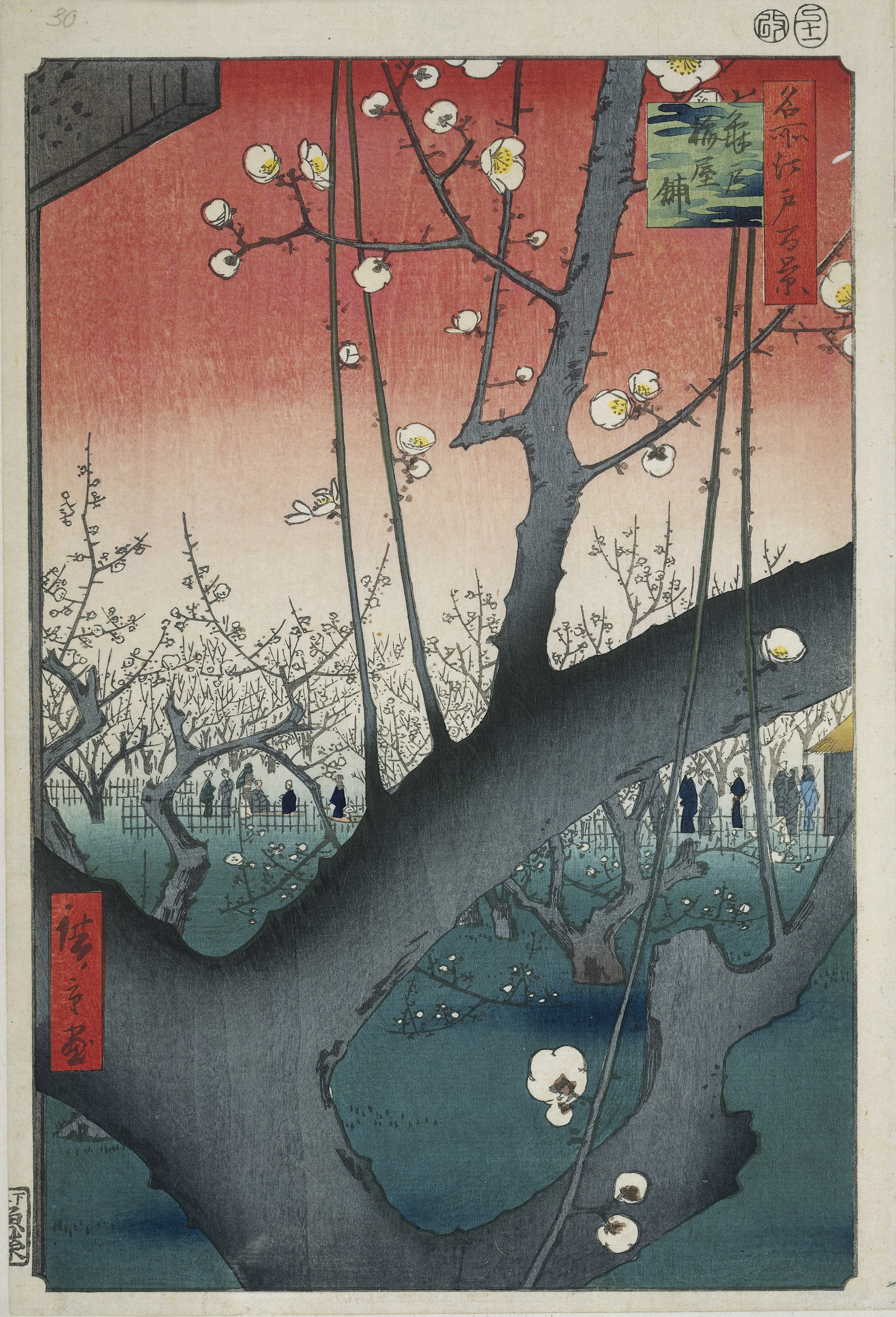
Edo, print 30: The Plum Garden in Kameido

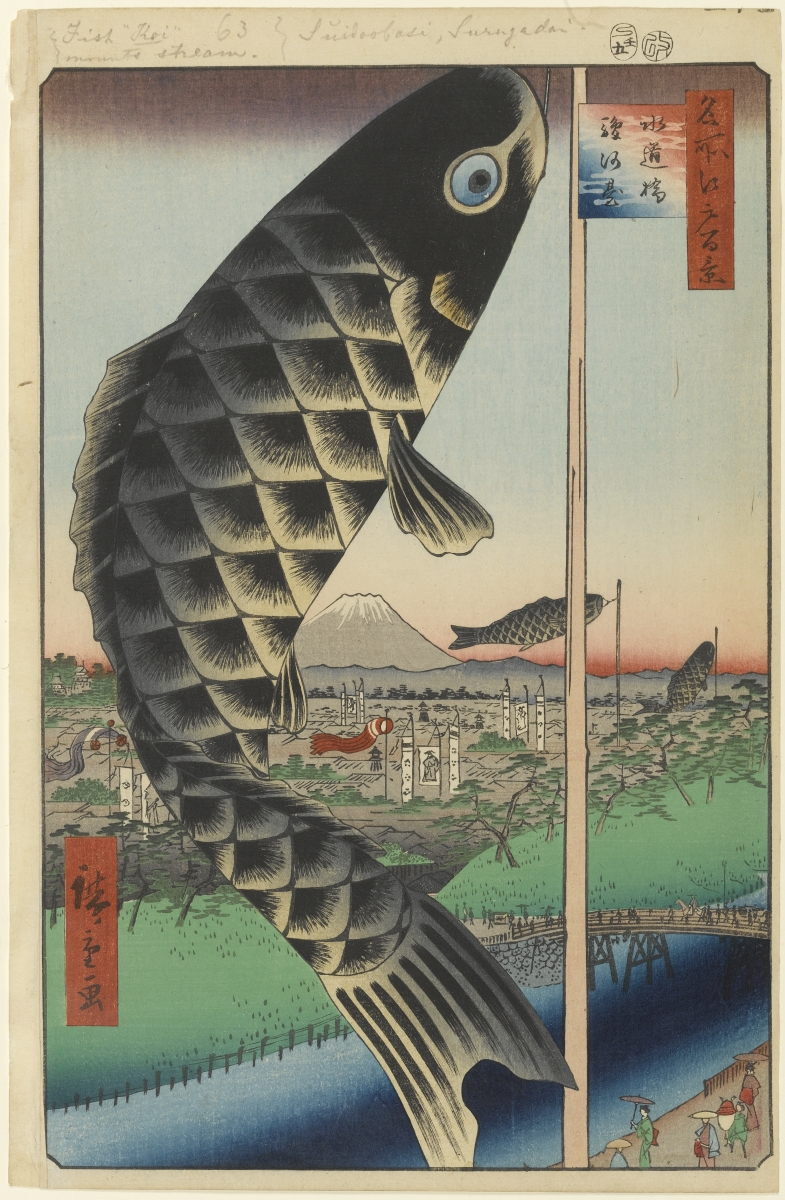
Edo, print 63: Suidō Bridge and the Surugadai Quarter

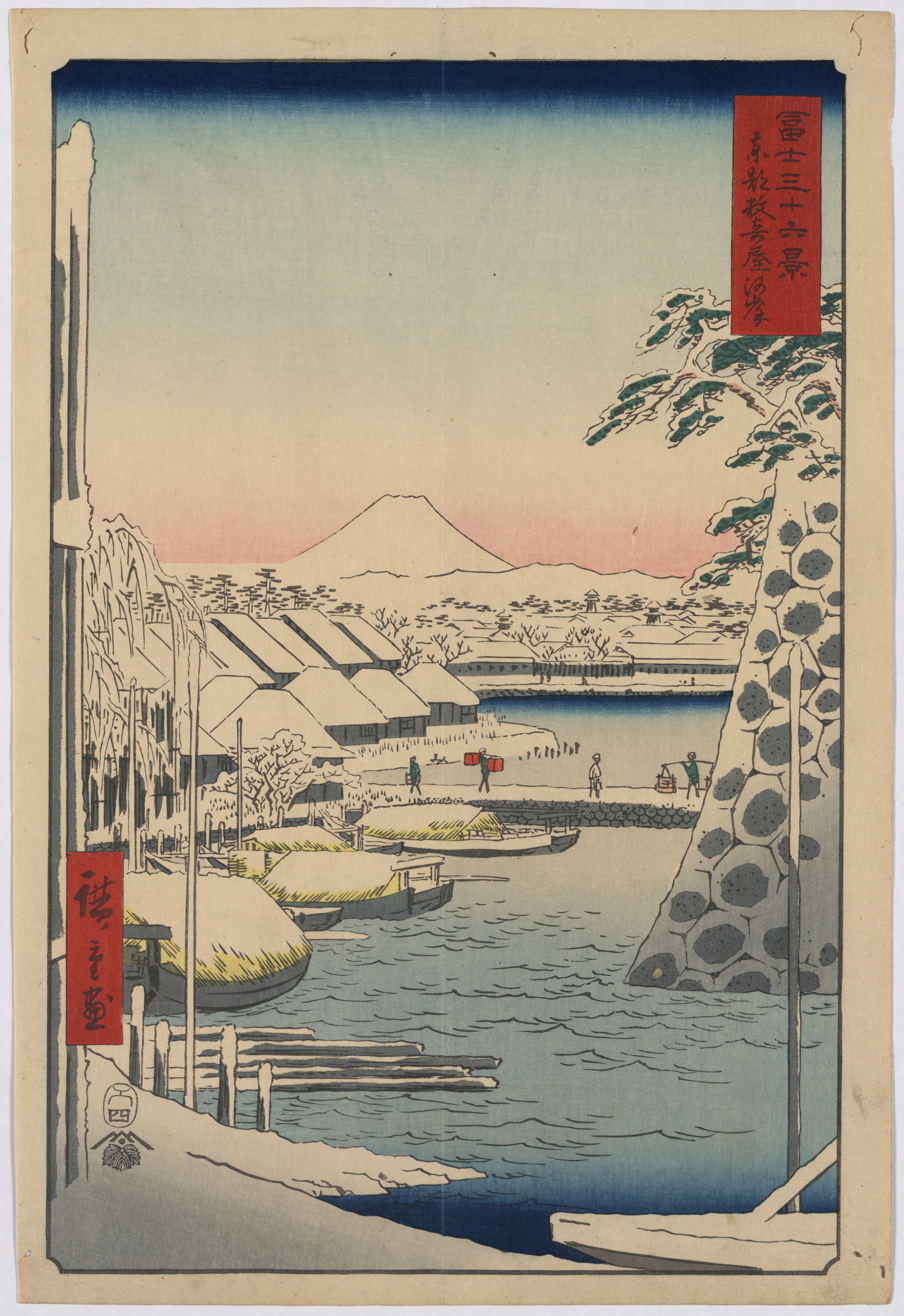
Thirty-six Views, print 3: Sukiyagashi in the Eastern Capital

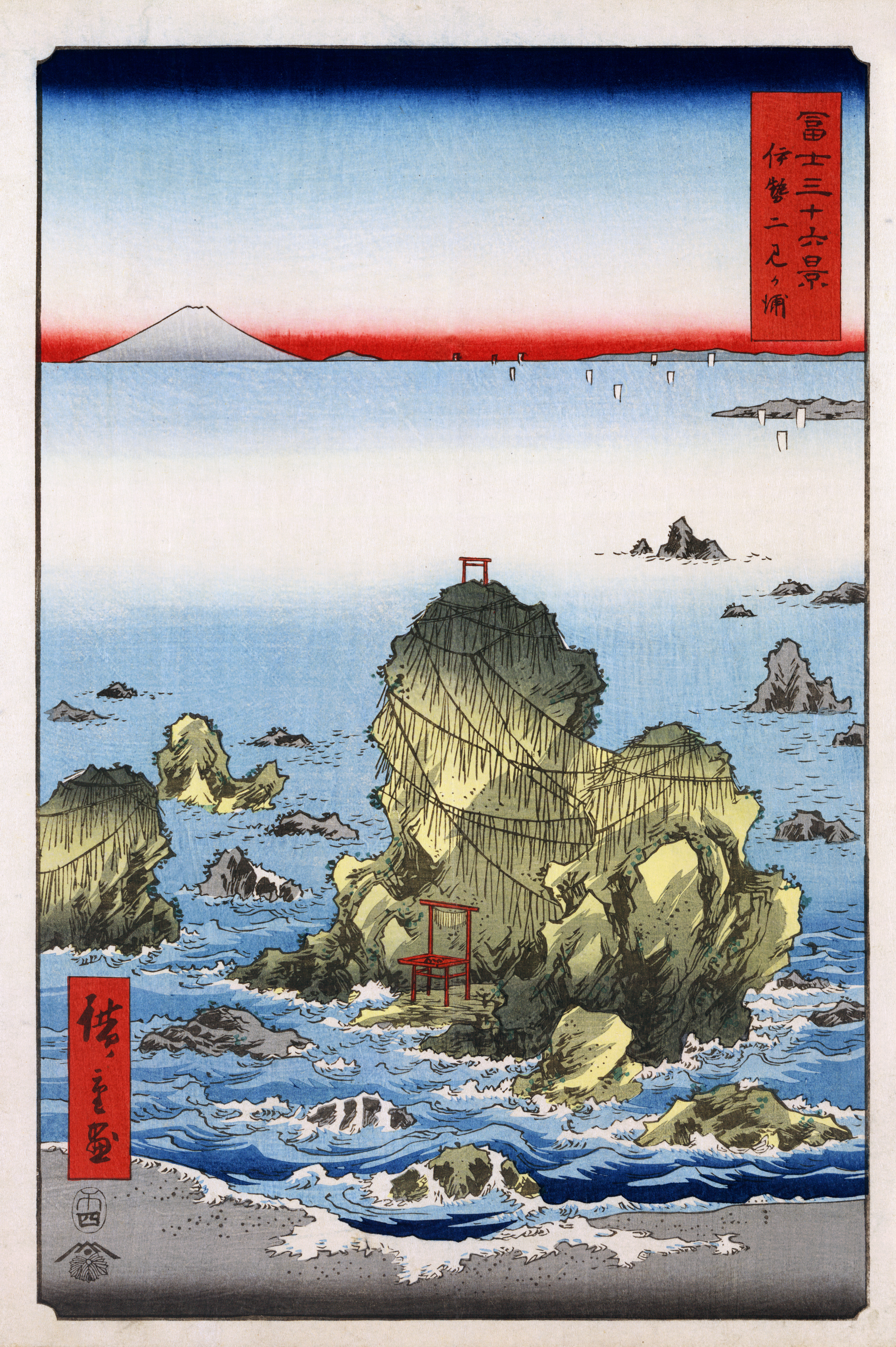
Thirty-six Views, print 27: Futami Bay in Ise Province

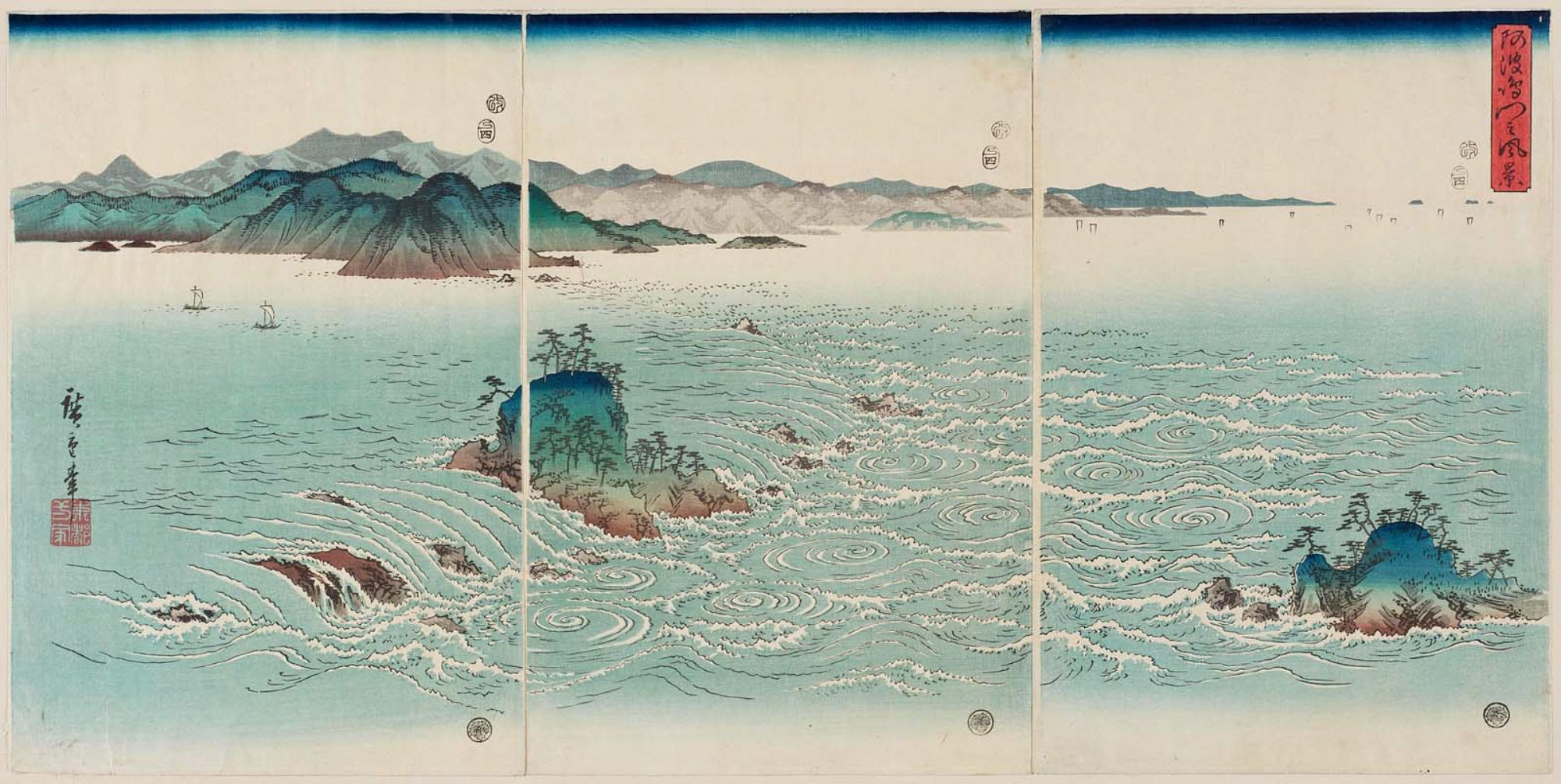
View of the Whirlpools at Awa triptych, 1857, part of the series "Snow, Moon and Flowers"

=== Hiroshige's students ===
Hiroshige II was a young print artist, Chinpei Suzuki, who married Hiroshige's daughter, Otatsu. He was given the artist name of "Shigenobu". Hiroshige intended to make Shigenobu his heir in all matters, and Shigenobu adopted the name "Hiroshige" after his master's death in 1858, and thus today is known as Hiroshige II. However, the marriage to Otatsu was troubled and in 1865 they separated. Otatsu was remarried to another former pupil of Hiroshige, Shigemasa, who appropriated the name of the lineage and today is known as Hiroshige III. Both Hiroshige II and Hiroshige III worked in a distinctive style based on that of Hiroshige, but neither achieved the level of success and recognition accorded to their master. Other students of Hiroshige I include Utagawa Shigemaru, Utagawa Shigekiyo, and Utagawa Hirokage.

Followers of Hiroshige

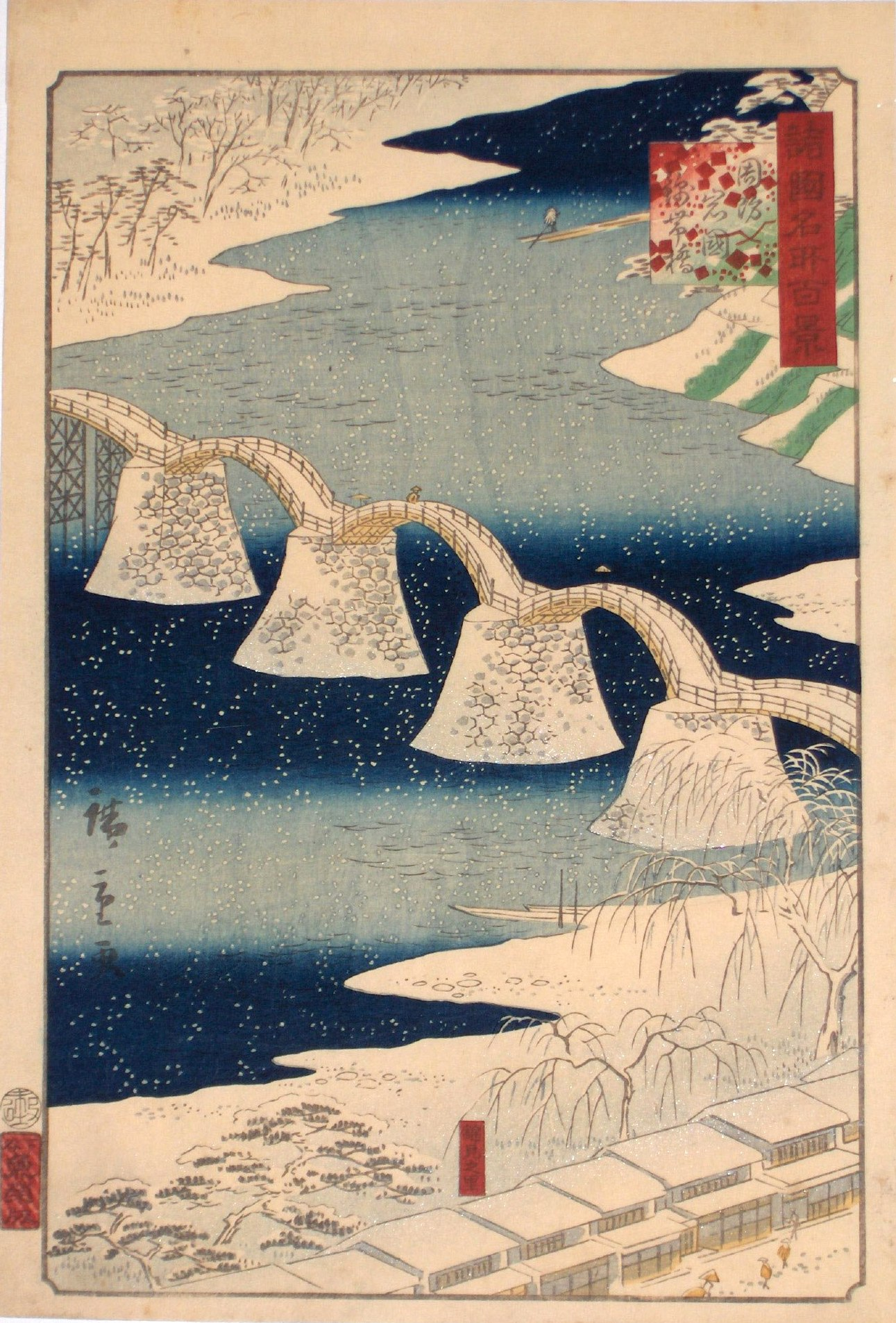
Suō Iwakuni, Hiroshige II, 1859

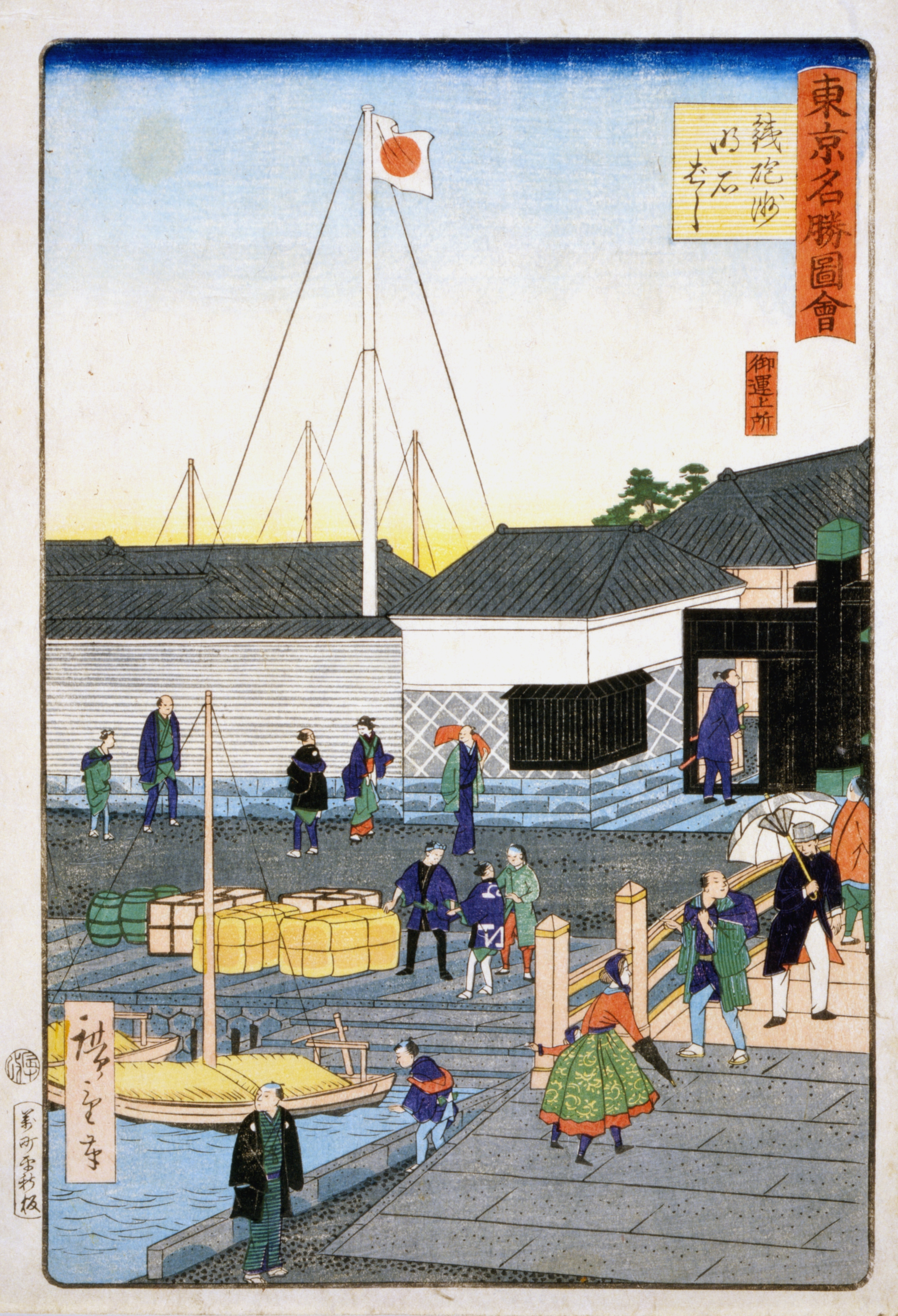
Teppōzu Akashi-bashi, Hiroshige III, c. 1870

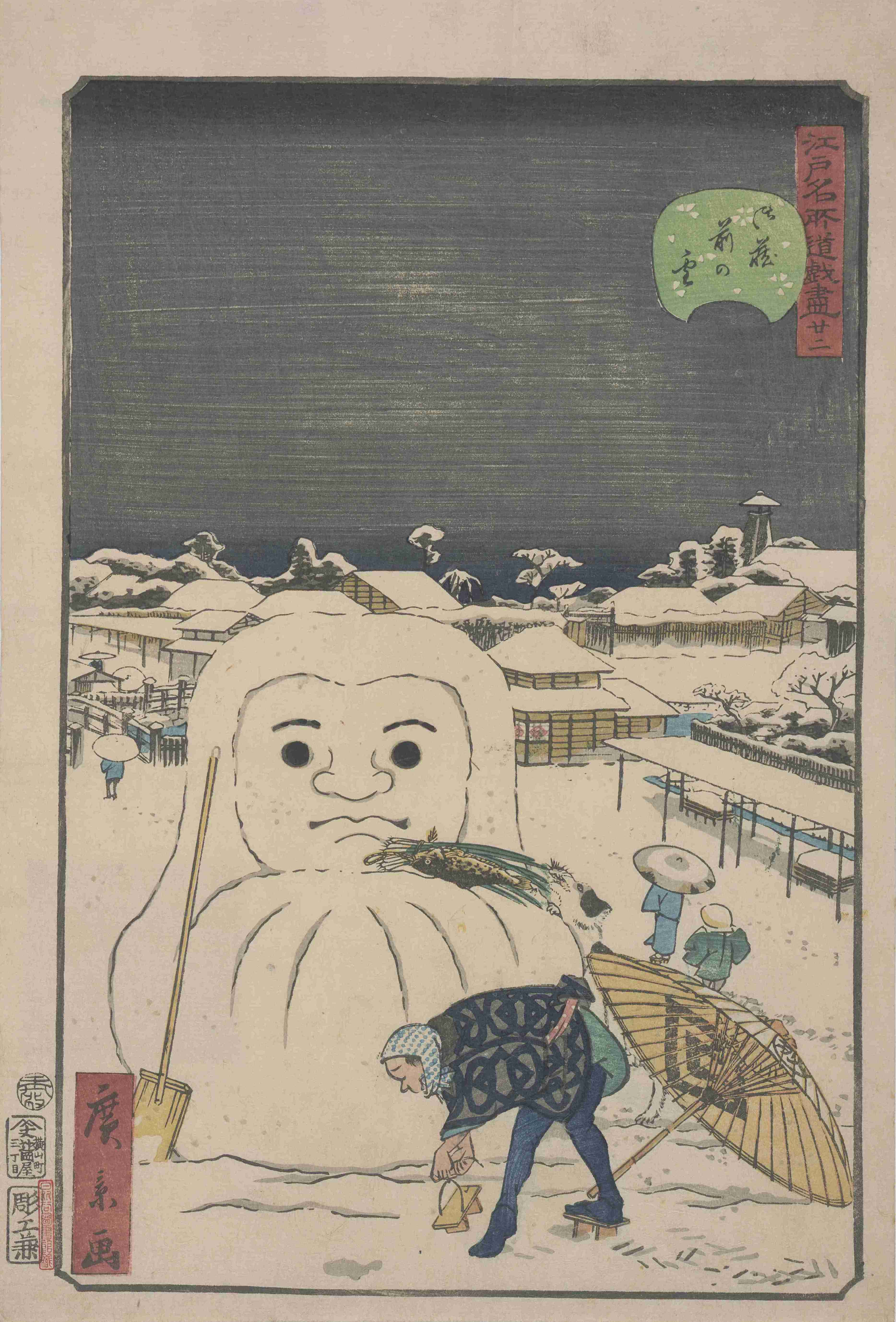
Dog stealing a workman's meal from a snow Daruma, Hirokage, c. 1855–56

== Late life ==
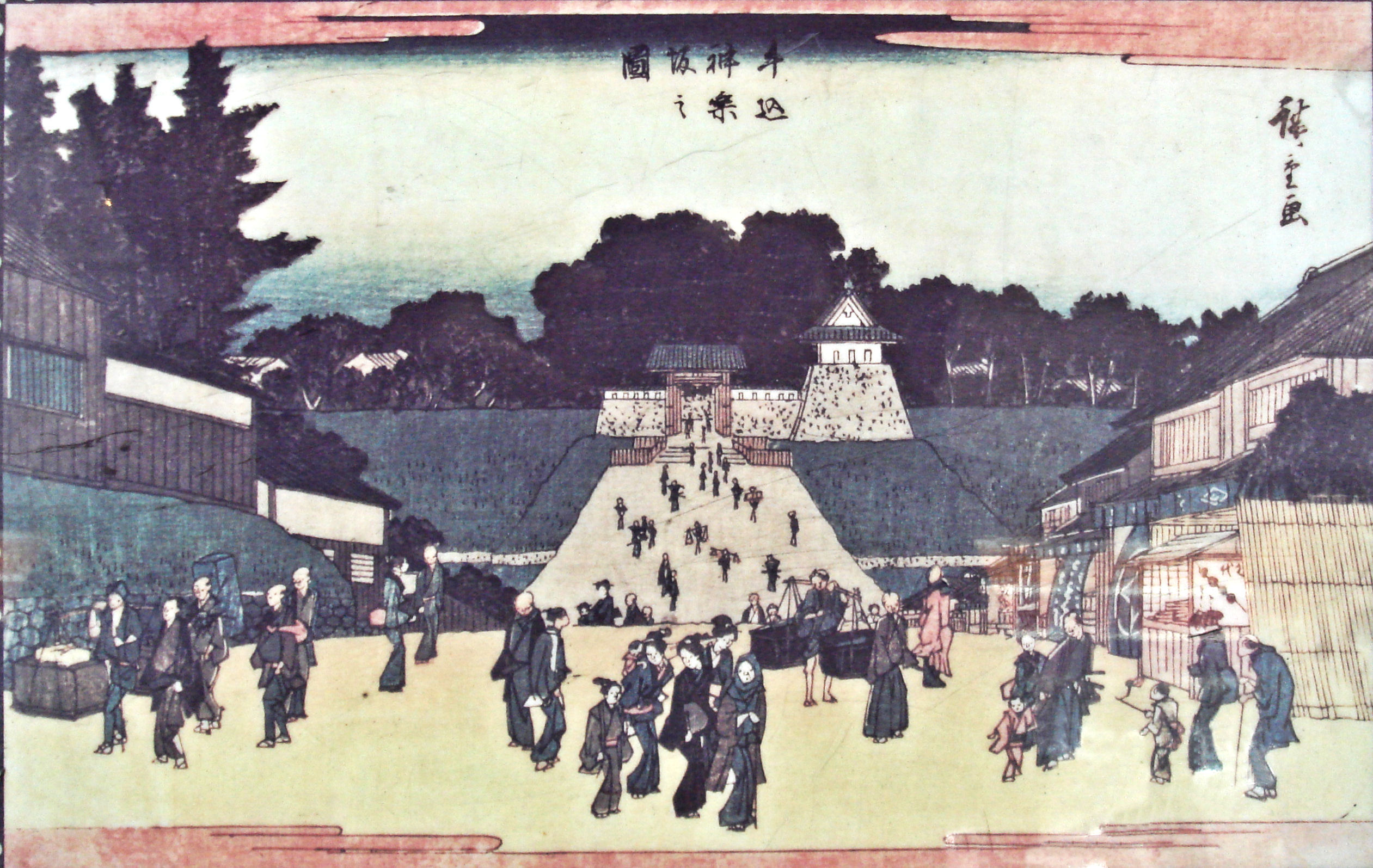
View of Kagurazaka and Ushigome bridge to Edo Castle (牛込神楽坂の図), by Utagawa Hiroshige, 1840

In his declining years, Hiroshige still produced thousands of prints to meet the demand for his works, but few were as good as those of his early and middle periods. He never lived in financial comfort, even in old age. In no small part, his prolific output stemmed from the fact that he was poorly paid per series, although he was still capable of remarkable art when the conditions were right—his great One Hundred Famous Views of Edo (名所江戸百景 Meisho Edo Hyakkei) was paid for up-front by a wealthy Buddhist priest in love with the daughter of the publisher, Uoya Eikichi (a former fishmonger).

In 1856, Hiroshige "retired from the world", becoming a Buddhist monk; this was the year he began his One Hundred Famous Views of Edo. He died aged 62 during the great Edo cholera epidemic of 1858 (whether the epidemic killed him is unknown) and was buried in a Zen Buddhist temple in Asakusa. Just before his death, he left a farewell poem:

東路に
筆を残して
旅の空
西のみくにの
名所を見む

I leave my brush in the East,
And set forth on my journey.
I shall see the famous places in the Western Land.

(The Western Land in this context refers to the strip of land by the Tōkaidō between Kyoto and Edo, but it does double duty as a reference to the paradise of the Amida Buddha).

Despite his productivity and popularity, Hiroshige was not wealthy—his commissions were less than those of other in-demand artists, amounting to an income of about twice the wages of a day labourer. His will left instructions for the payment of his debts.

== Works ==
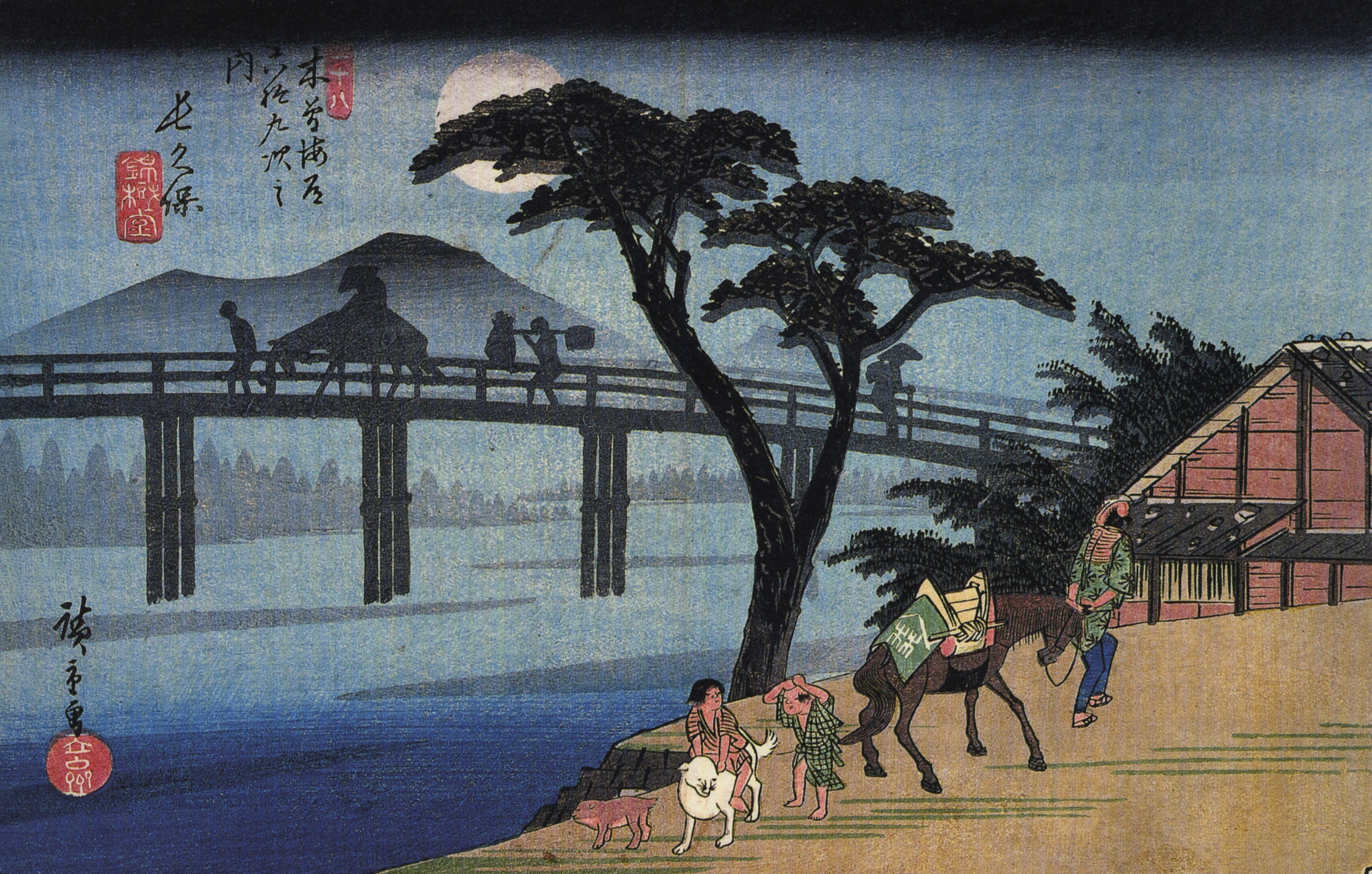
A rather dark printing of the view sometimes dubbed "Man on Horseback Crossing a Bridge". From the series The Sixty-nine Stations of the Kiso Kaidō, this is View 28 and Station 27 at Nagakubo-shuku, depicting the Wada Bridge across the Yoda River.

Hiroshige produced over 8,000 works. He largely confined himself in his early work to common ukiyo-e themes such as women (美人画 bijin-ga) and actors (役者絵 yakusha-e). Then, after the death of Toyohiro, Hiroshige made a dramatic turnabout, with the 1831 landscape series Famous Views of the Eastern Capital (東都名所 Tōto Meisho) which was critically acclaimed for its composition and colors. This set is generally distinguished from Hiroshige's many print sets depicting Edo by referring to it as Ichiyūsai Gakki, a title derived from the fact that he signed it as Ichiyūsai Hiroshige. With The Fifty-three Stations of the Tōkaidō (1833–1834), his success was assured. These designs were drawn from Hiroshige's actual travels of the full distance of 490 kilometers (300 mi). They included details of date, location, and anecdotes of his fellow travelers, and were immensely popular. In fact, this series was so popular that he reissued it in three versions, one of which was made jointly with Kunisada. Hiroshige went on to produce more than 2000 different prints of Edo and post stations Tōkaidō, as well as series such as The Sixty-nine Stations of the Kisokaidō (1834–1842) and his own Thirty-six Views of Mount Fuji (1852–1858). Of his estimated total of 5000 designs, these landscapes comprised the largest proportion of any genre.

He dominated landscape printmaking with his unique brand of intimate, almost small-scale works compared against the older traditions of landscape painting descended from Chinese landscape painters such as Sesshu. The travel prints generally depict travelers along famous routes experiencing the special attractions of various stops along the way. They travel in the rain, in snow, and during all of the seasons. In 1856, working with the publisher Uoya Eikichi, he created a series of luxury edition prints, made with the finest printing techniques including true gradation of color, the addition of mica to lend a unique iridescent effect, embossing, fabric printing, blind printing, and the use of glue printing (wherein ink is mixed with glue for a glittery effect). Hiroshige pioneered the use of the vertical format in landscape printing in his series Famous Views of the Sixty-odd Provinces. One Hundred Famous Views of Edo (issued serially between 1856 and 1859) was immensely popular. The set was published posthumously and some prints had not been completed—he had created over 100 on his own, but two were added by Hiroshige II after his death.

== Influence ==
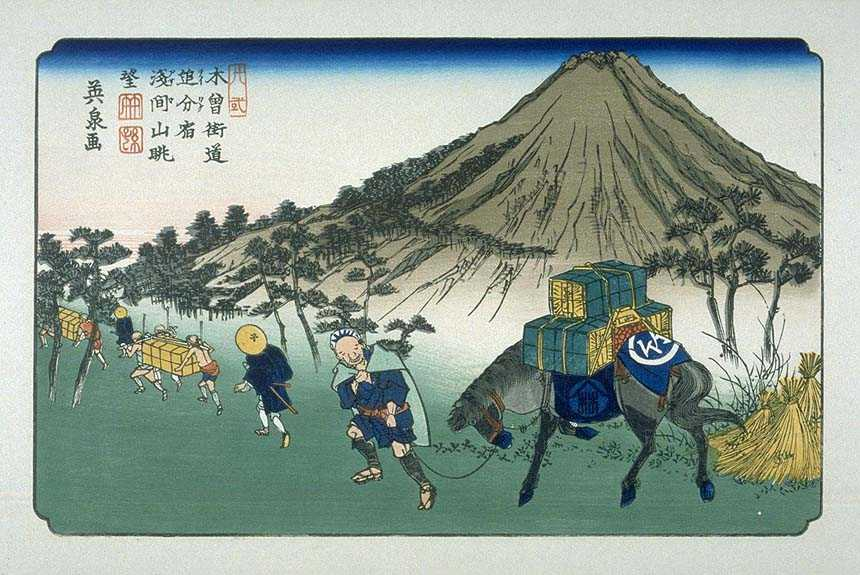
Keisai Eisen was influenced by and worked with Hiroshige. Oiwake, from The Sixty-nine Stations of the Kiso Kaidō, 1830s.

Hiroshige was a member of the Utagawa school, along with Kunisada and Kuniyoshi. The Utagawa school comprised dozens of artists, and stood at the forefront of 19th century woodblock prints. Particularly noteworthy for their actor and historical prints, members of the Utagawa school were nonetheless well-versed in all of the popular genres.

During Hiroshige's time, the print industry was booming, and the consumer audience for prints was growing rapidly. Prior to this time, most print series had been issued in small sets, such as ten or twelve designs per series. Increasingly large series were produced to meet demand, and this trend can be seen in Hiroshige's work, such as The Sixty-nine Stations of the Kisokaidō and One Hundred Famous Views of Edo.

In terms of style, Hiroshige is especially noted for using unusual vantage points, seasonal allusions, and striking colors. In particular, he worked extensively within the realm of meisho-e (名所絵) pictures of famous places. During the Edo period, tourism was also booming, leading to increased popular interest in travel. Travel guides abounded, and towns appeared along routes such as the Tōkaidō, a road that connected Edo with Kyoto. In the midst of this burgeoning travel culture, Hiroshige drew upon his own travels, as well as tales of others' adventures, for inspiration in creating his landscapes. For example, in The Fifty-three Stations on the Tōkaidō (1833), he illustrates anecdotes from Travels on the Eastern Seaboard (東海道中膝栗毛 Tōkaidōchū Hizakurige, 1802–1809) by Jippensha Ikku, a comedy describing the adventures of two bumbling travelers as they make their way along the same road.

Hiroshige's The Fifty-three Stations of the Tōkaidō (1833–1834) and One Hundred Famous Views of Edo (1856–1858) greatly influenced French Impressionists such as Monet. Vincent van Gogh copied two of the One Hundred Famous Views of Edo which were among his collection of ukiyo-e prints. Hiroshige's style also influenced the Mir iskusstva, a 20th-century Russian art movement in which Ivan Bilibin and Mstislav Dobuzhinsky were major artists. Dobuzhinsky confessed of Hiroshige's influence "I liked to choose a viewpoint of my own so that the composition would be striking, unusual; in that, I had the constant example of Hiroshige before my eyes". Cézanne and Whistler were also amongst those under Hiroshige's influence. Hiroshige was regarded by Louis Gonse, director of the influential Gazette des Beaux-Arts and author of the two volume L'Art Japonais in 1883, as the greatest painter of landscapes of the 19th century.

Van Gogh copies of Hiroshige's prints

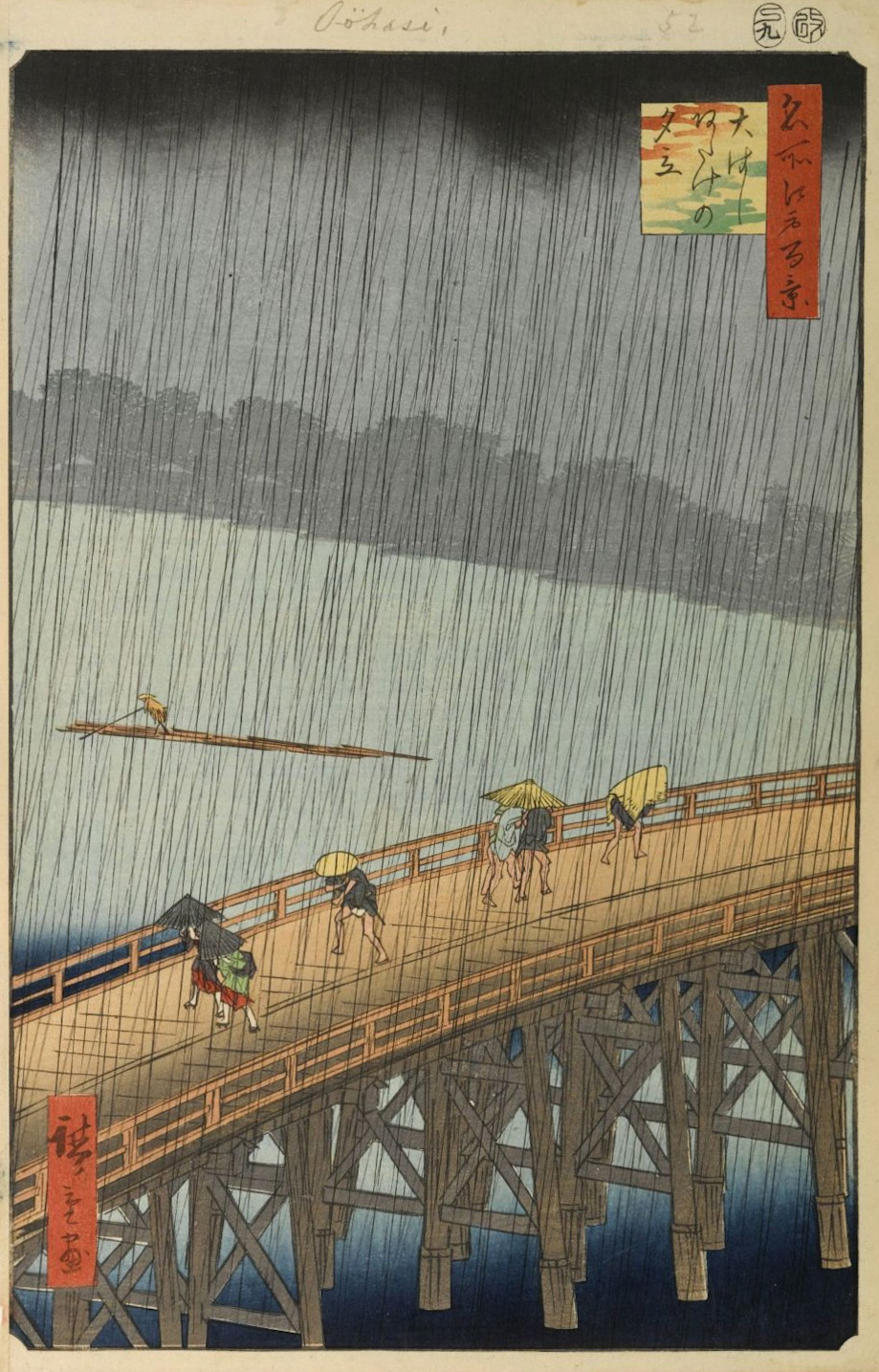
Sudden Shower Over Shin-Ohashi Bridge and Atake, Hiroshige, 1857
One of the One Hundred Famous Views of Edo

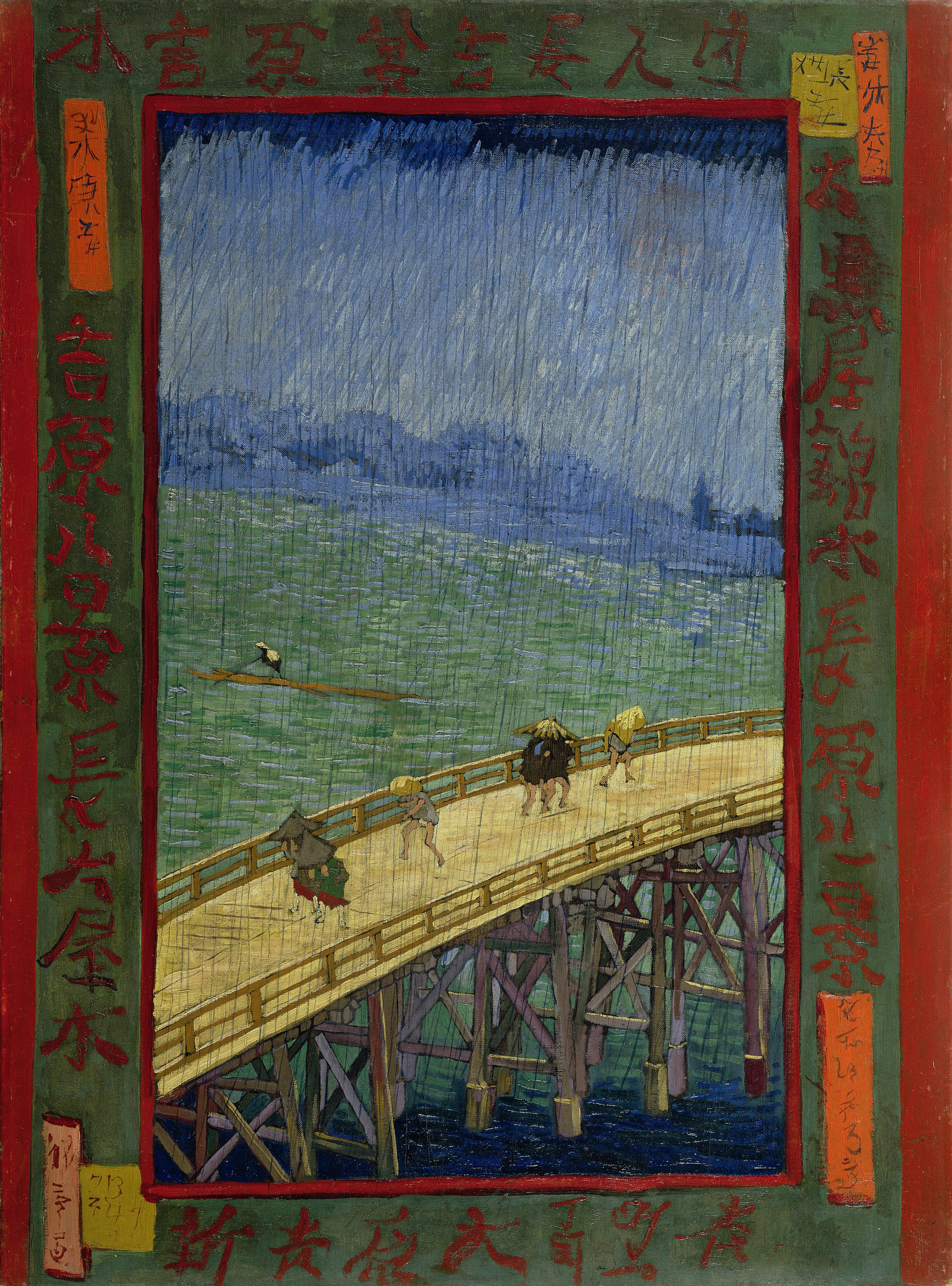
Bridge in the rain (after Hiroshige), Vincent van Gogh (from Japonaiserie), oil on canvas, 1887

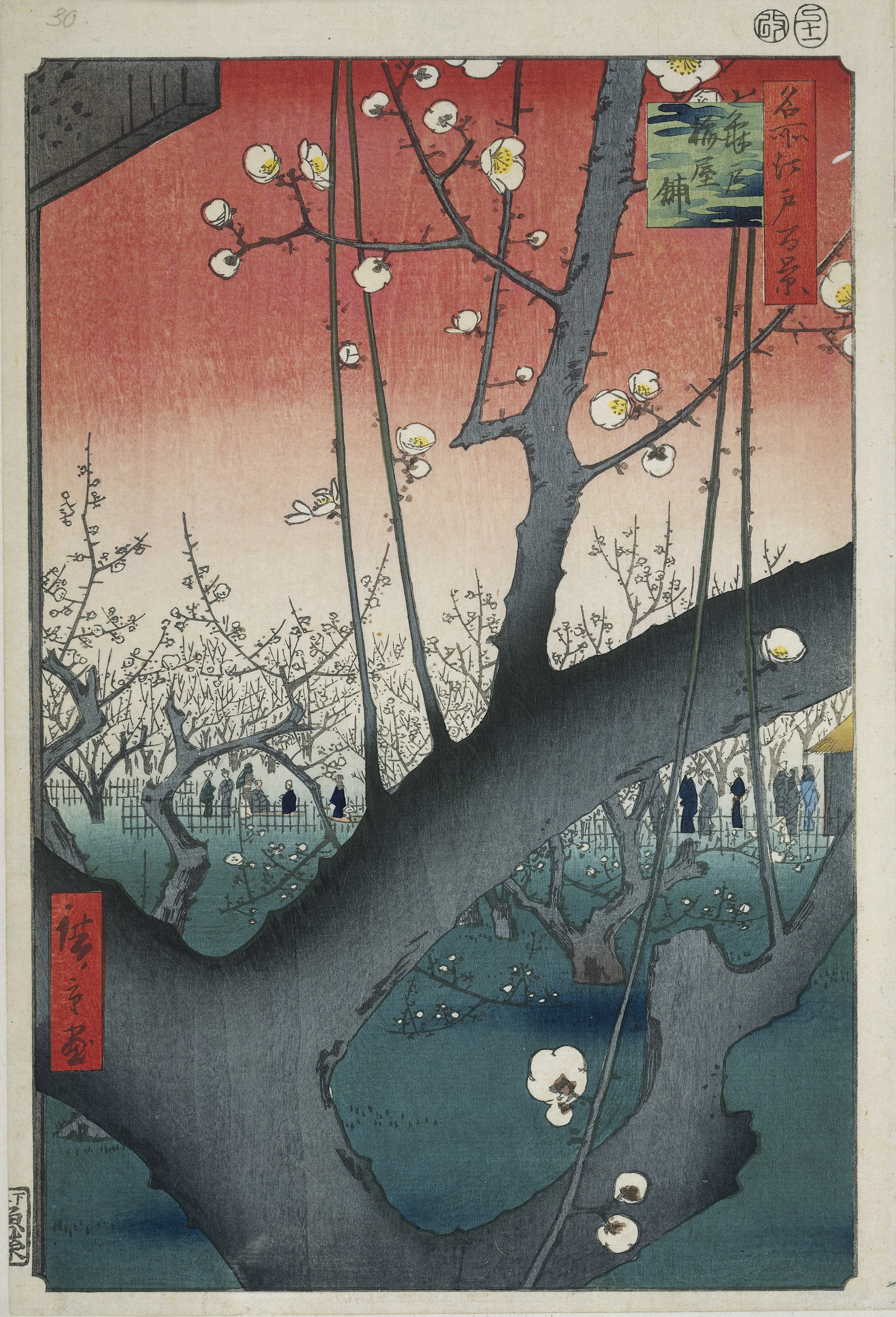
The Plum Garden in Kameido (1857), from Hiroshige's One Hundred Famous Views of Edo

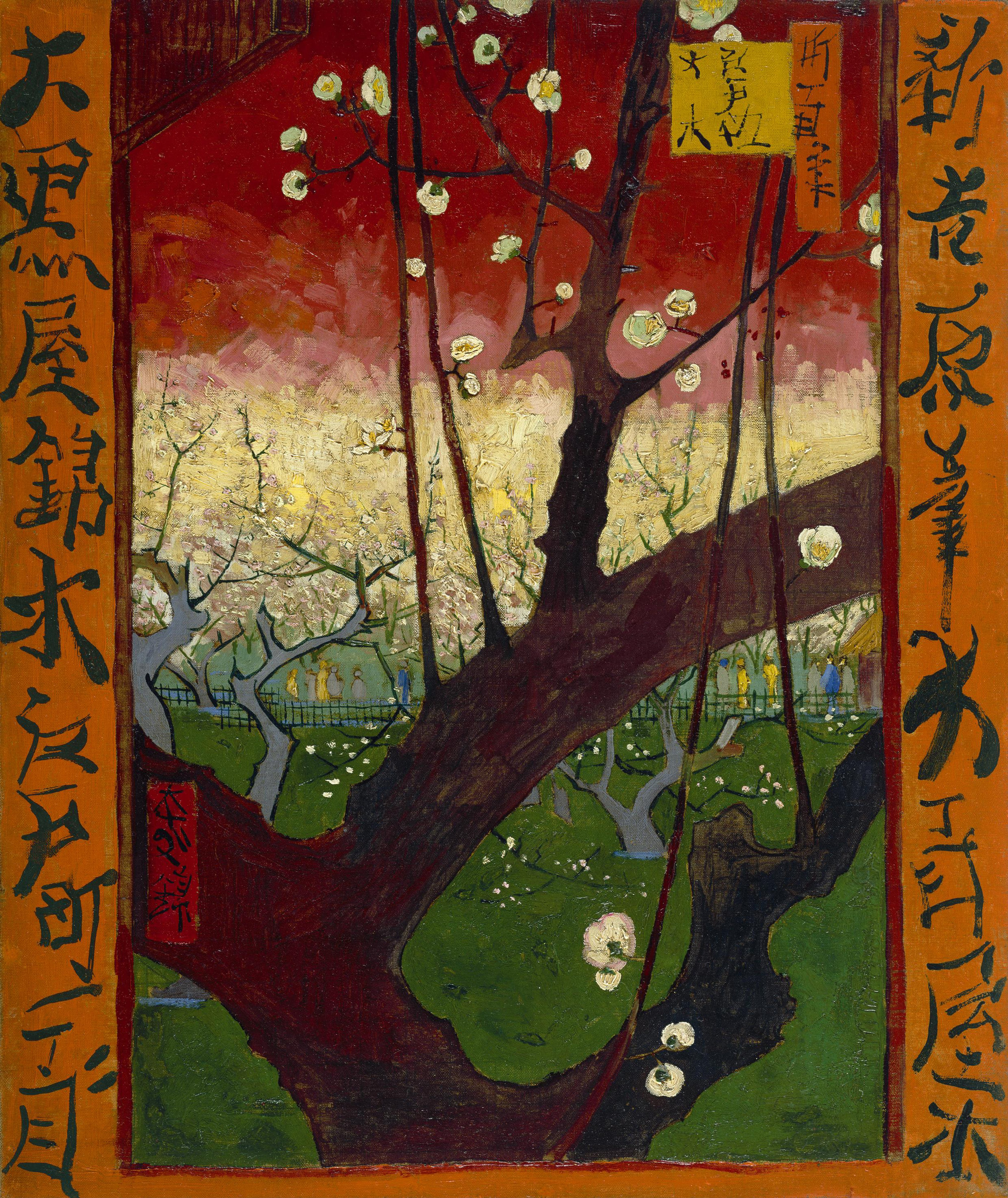
Flowering Plum Tree (after Hiroshige) (1887) by Vincent van Gogh, from his Japonaiserie, in the collection of the Van Gogh Museum in Amsterdam

== Gallery ==
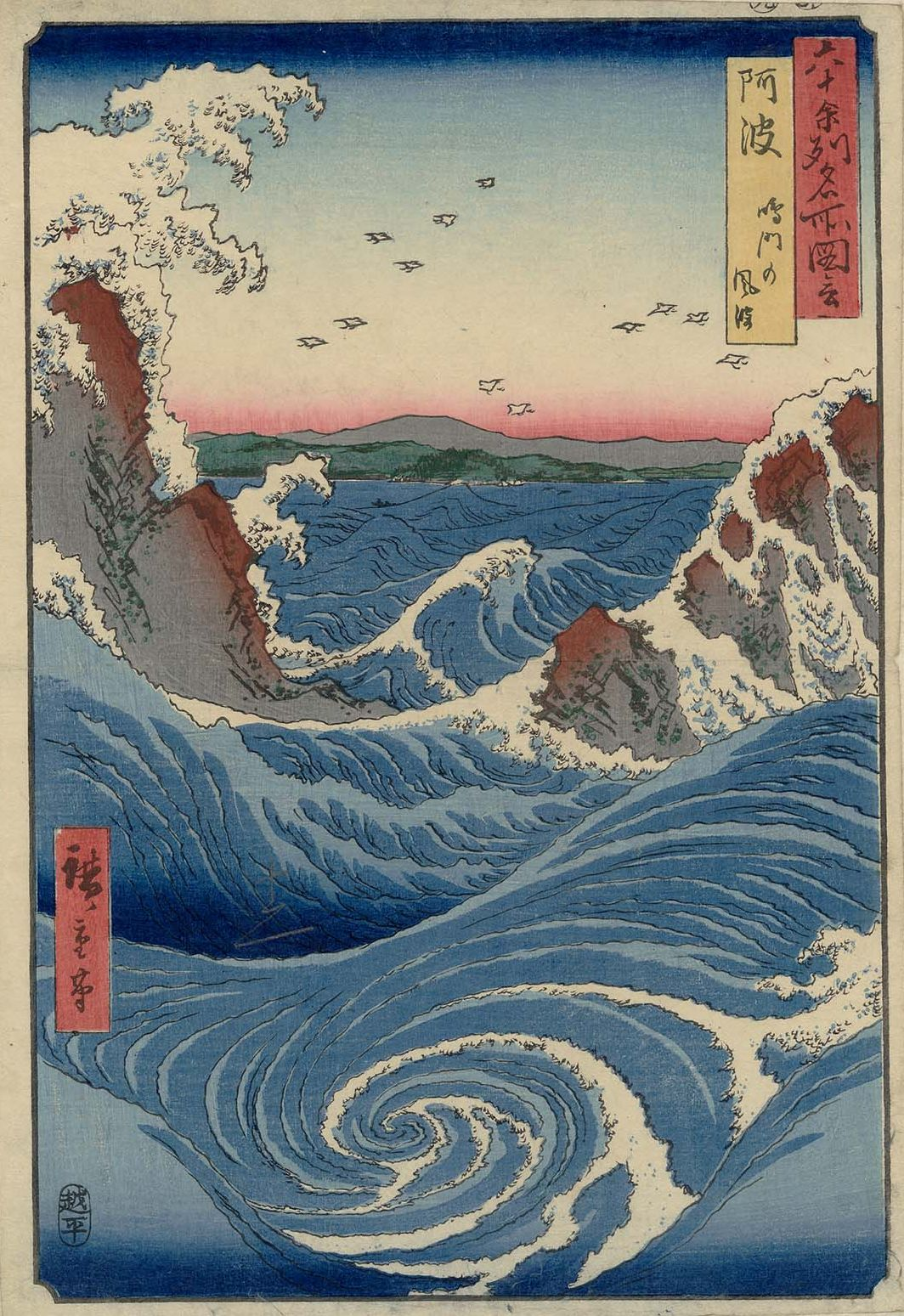
Naruto Whirlpool, Awa Province, from Famous Views of the Sixty-odd Provinces

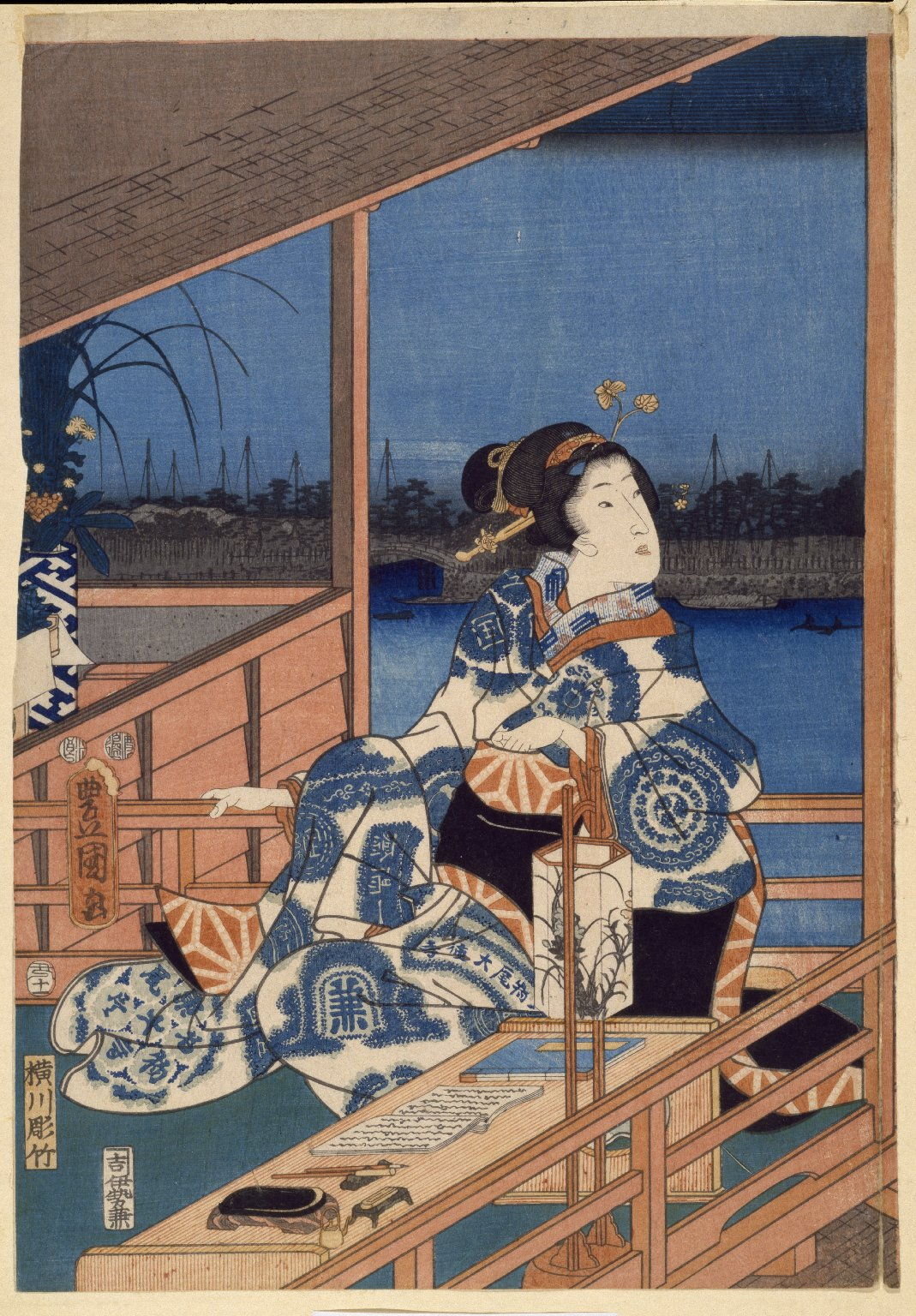
Moonlight View of Tsukuda with Lady on a Balcony

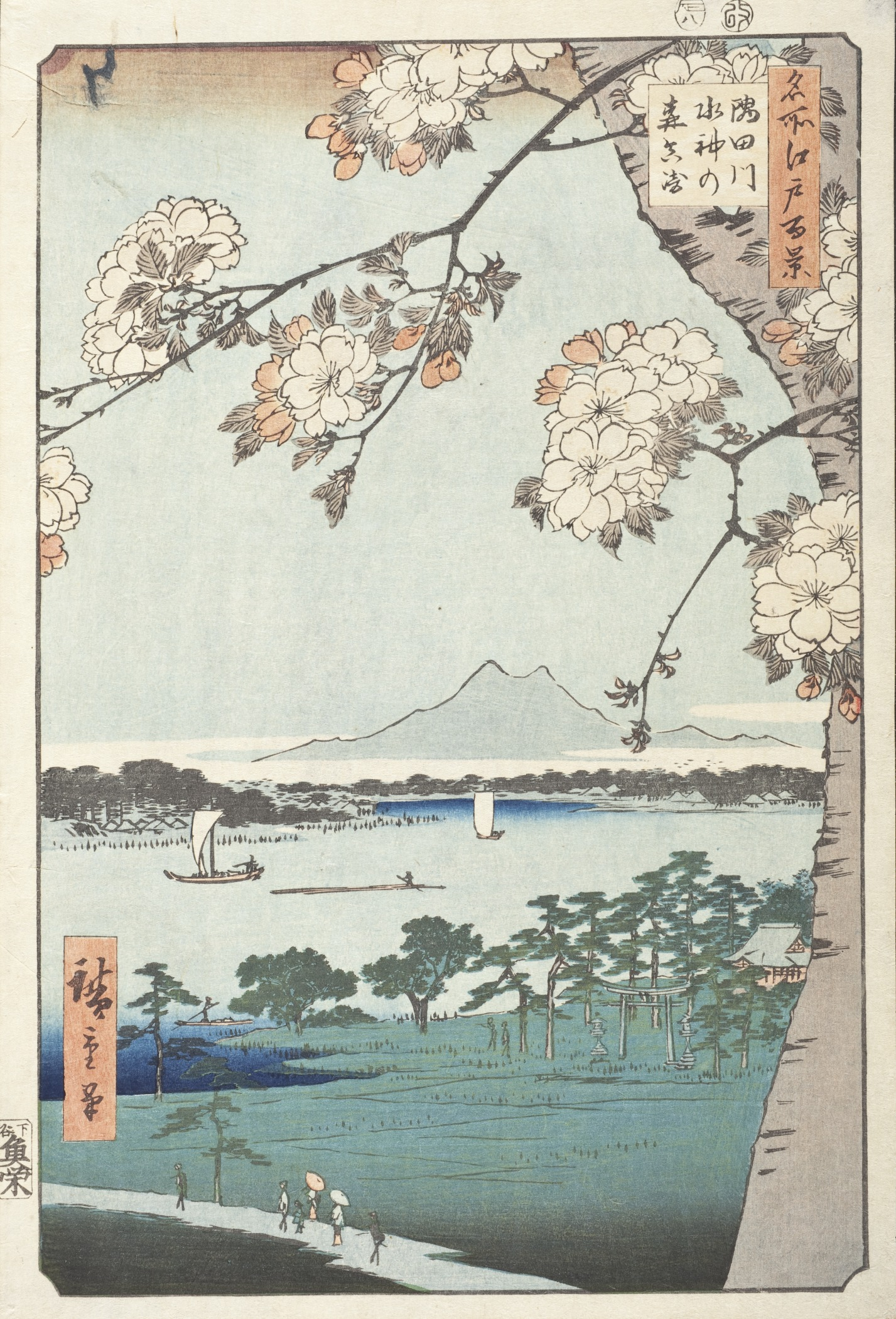
Sumida River, the Wood of the Water god

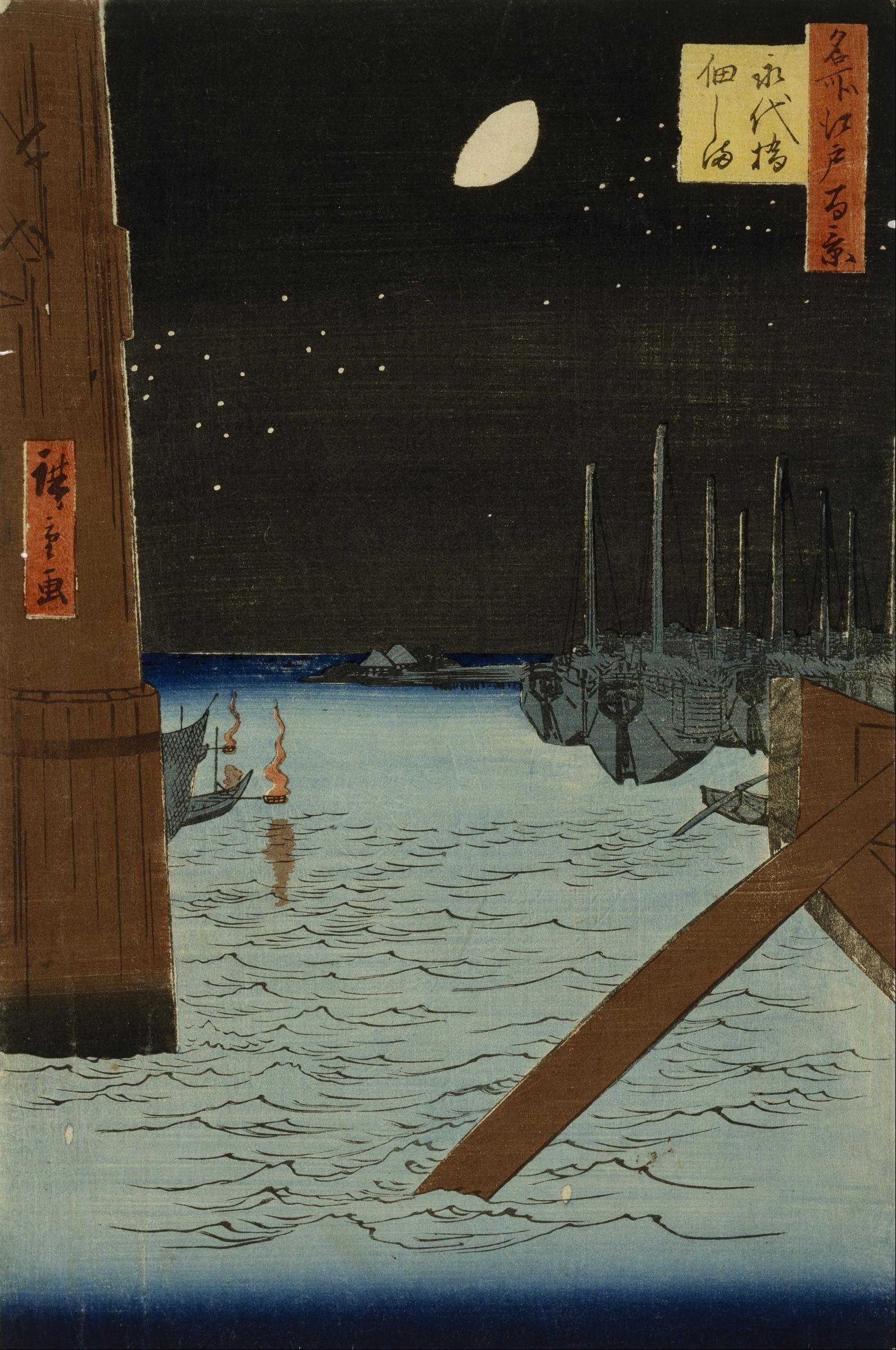
Moon over Ships Moored at Tsukuda Island from Eitai Bridge

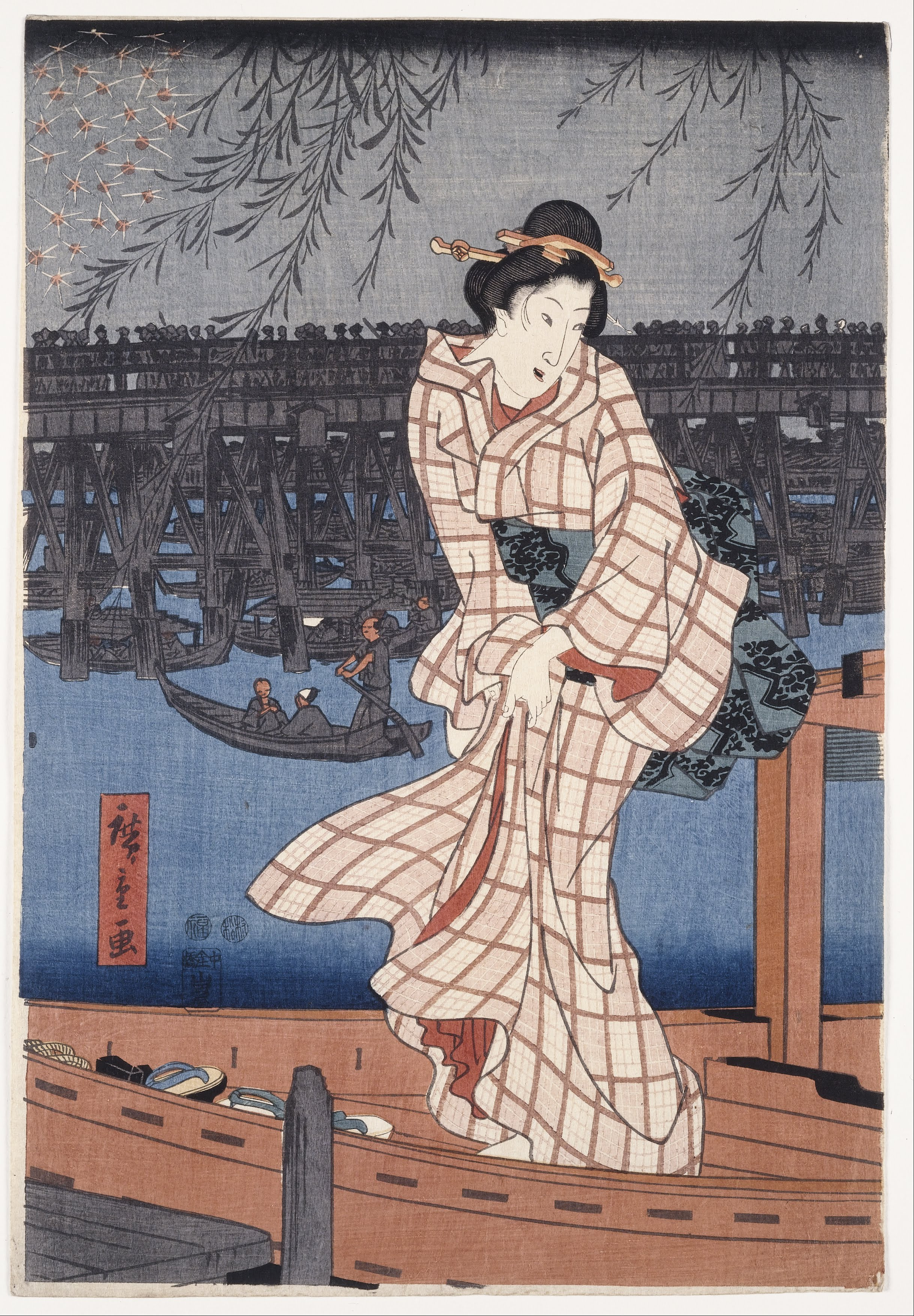
Evening on the Sumida river

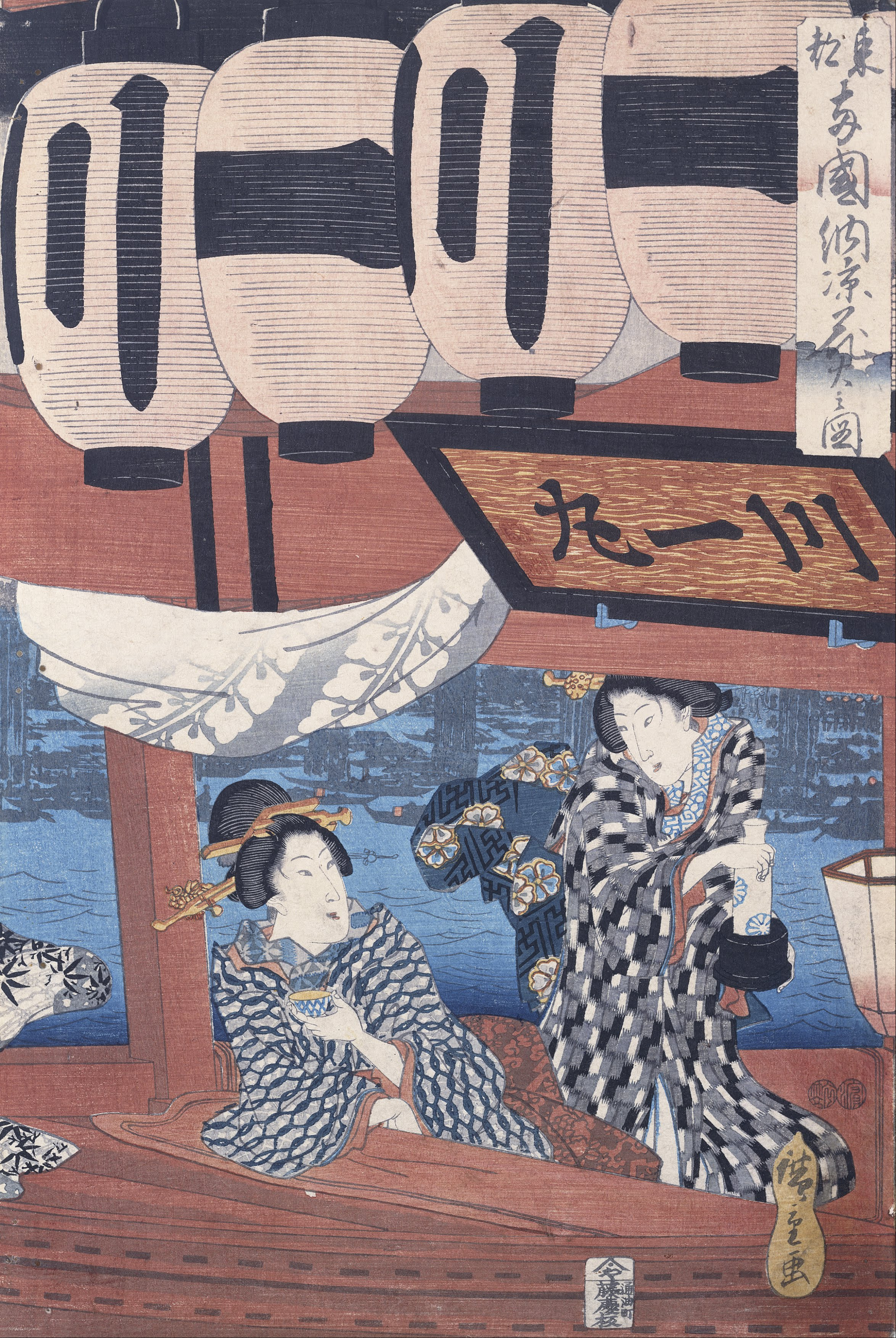
Enjoying the fireworks and the cool of the evening at Ryogoku bridge

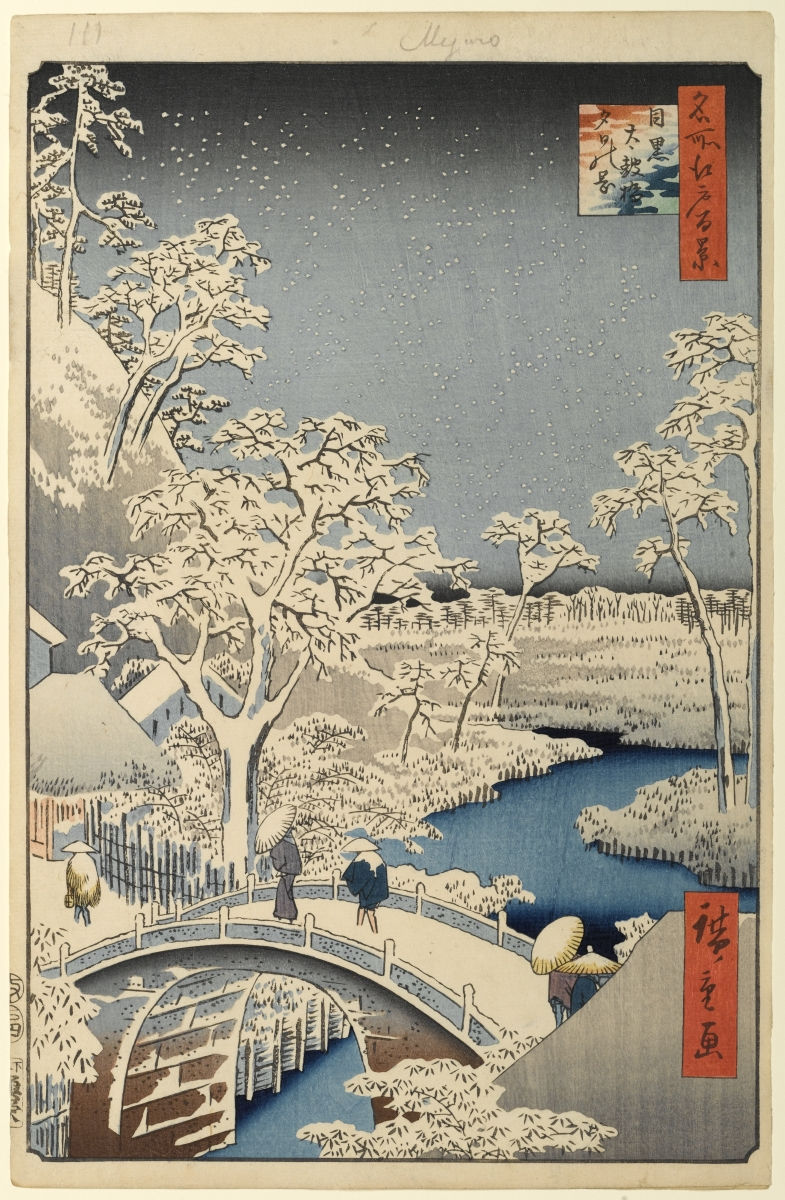
Moon Bridge in Meguro, from One Hundred Famous Views of Edo

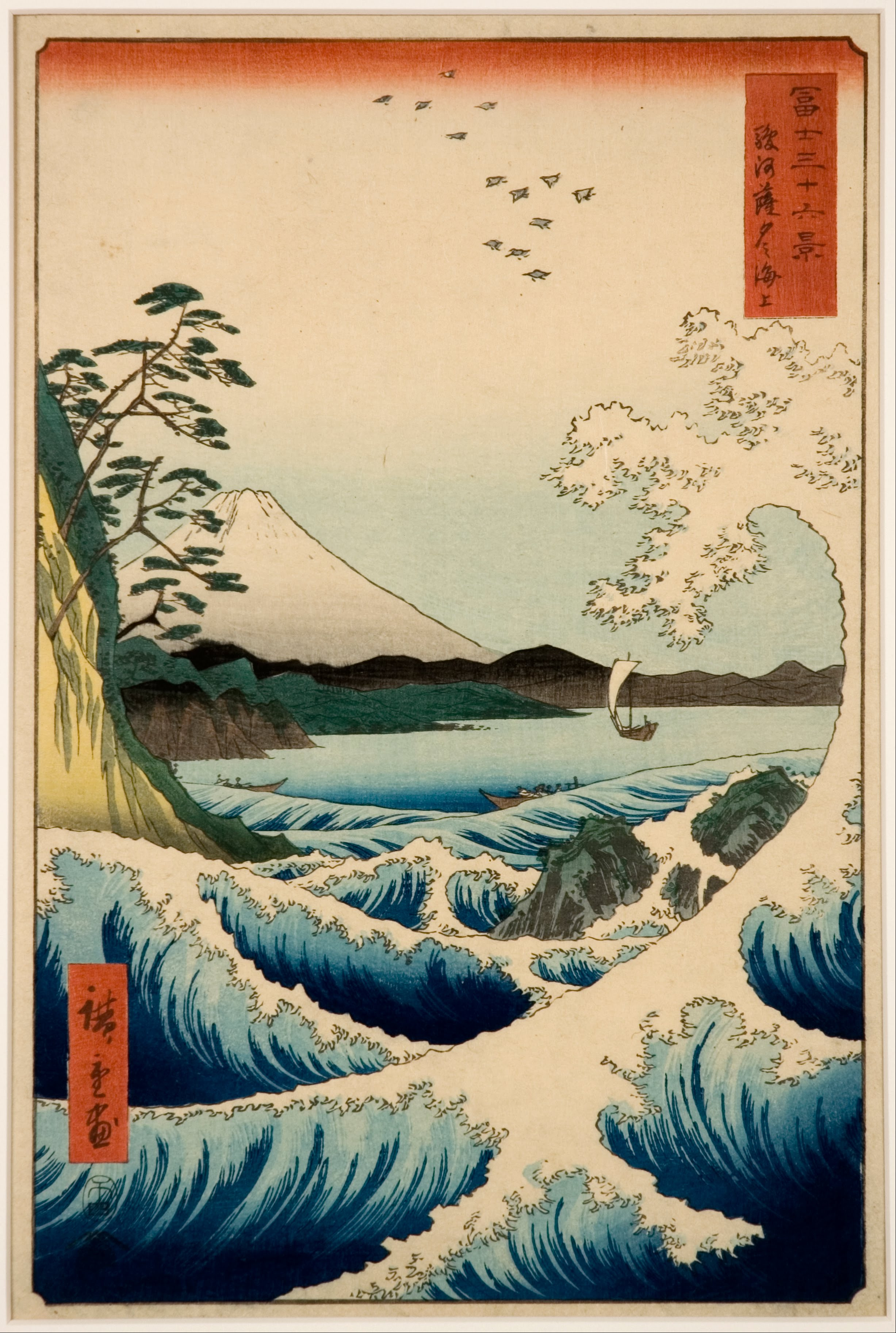
The Sea at Satta, Suruga Province, from Thirty-six Views of Mount Fuji

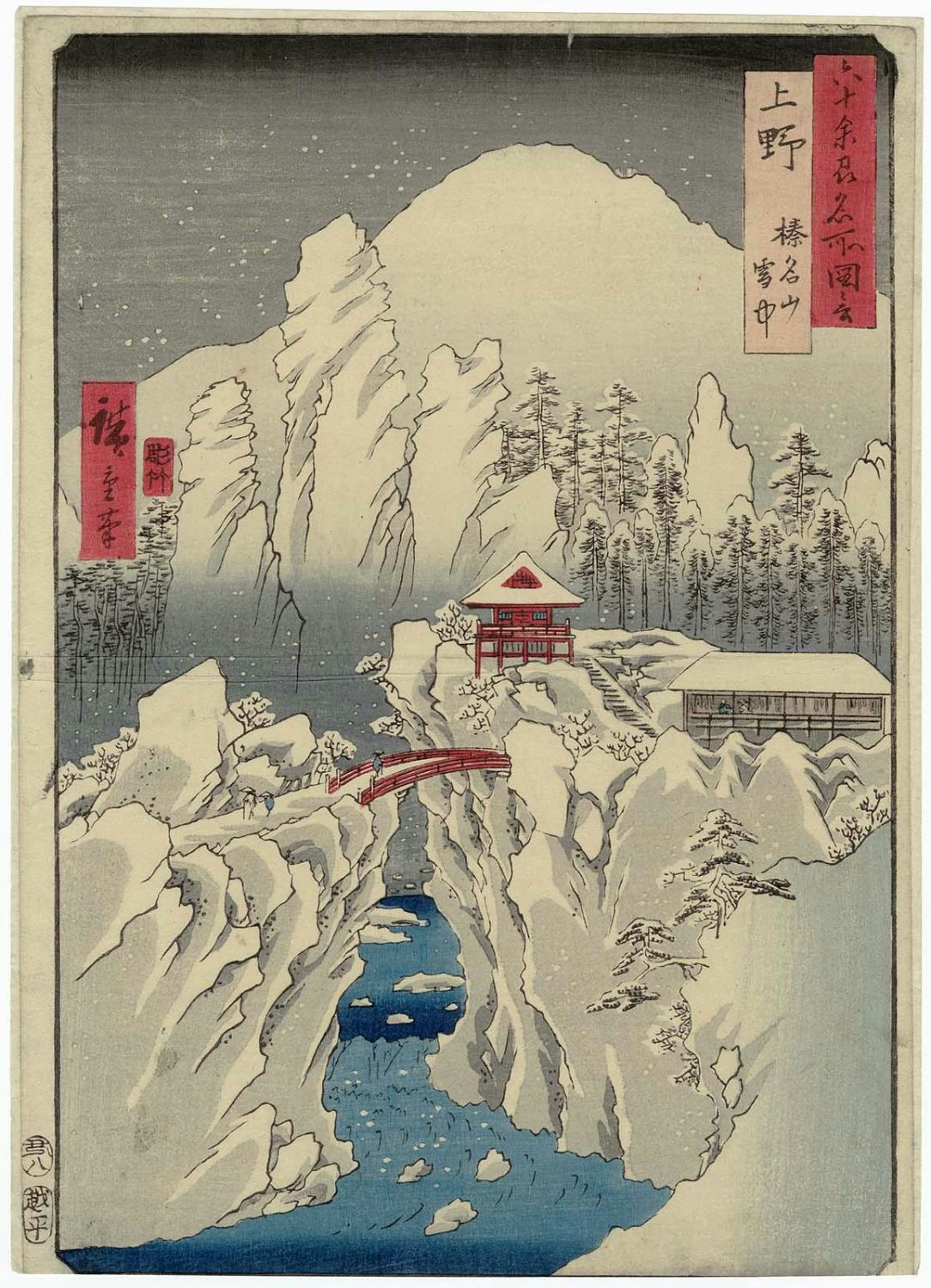
Kozuke Province, from Famous Views of the Sixty-odd Provinces

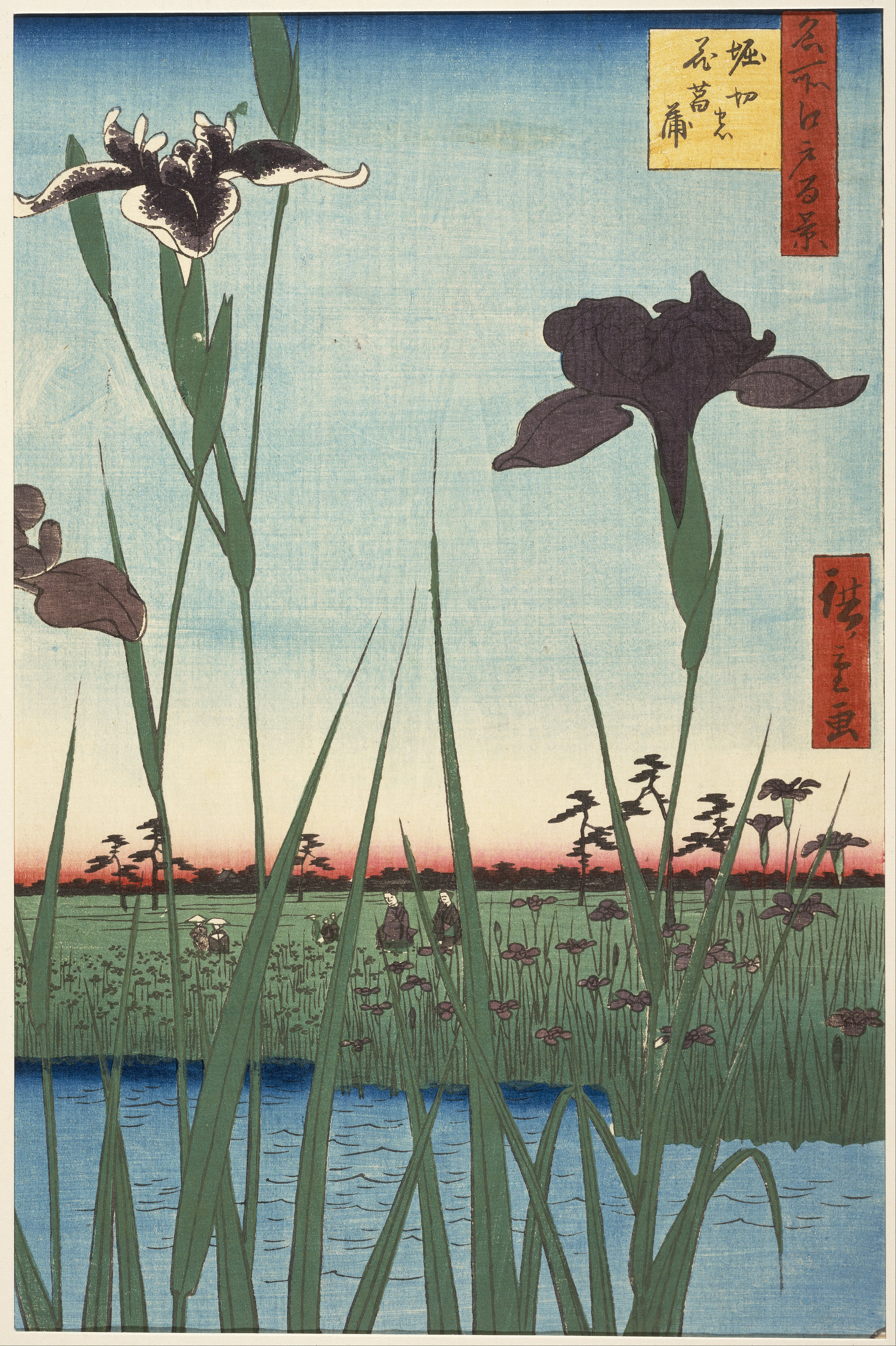
Horikiri Iris Garden (Horikiri no hanashōbu), from One Hundred Famous Views of Edo

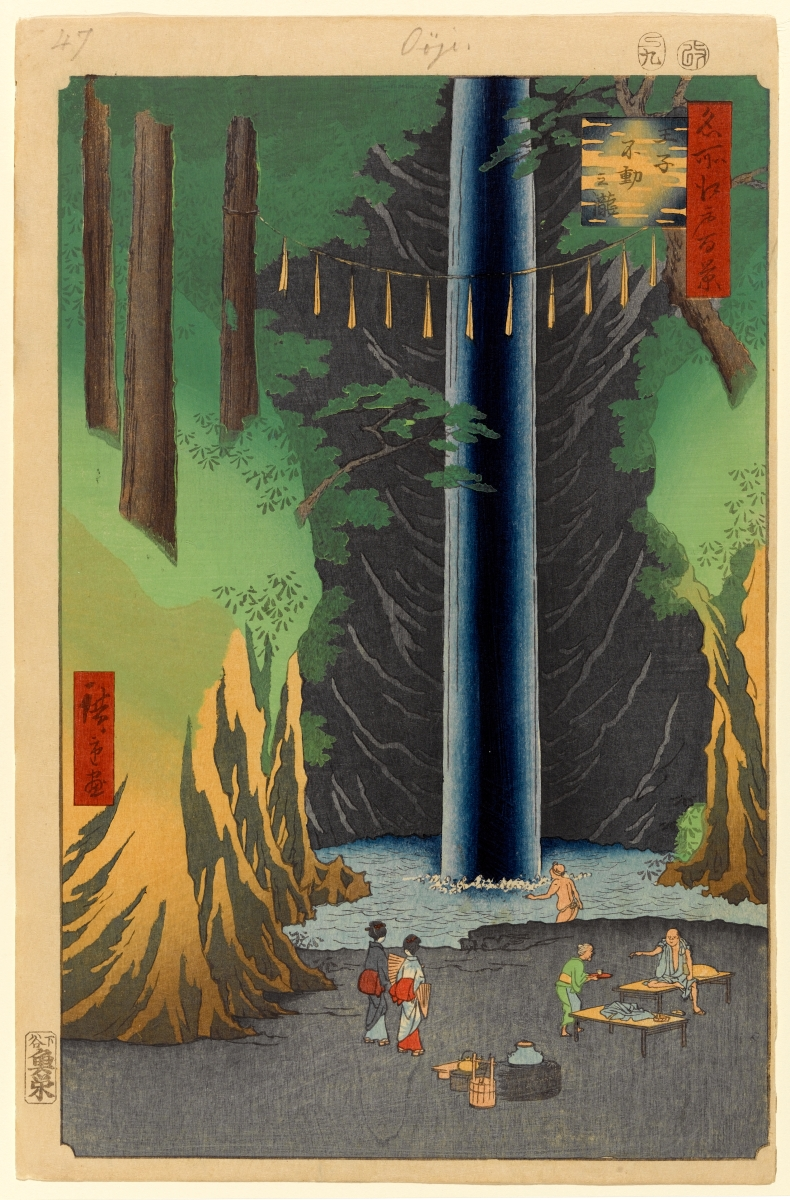
Fudo Falls, Oji, 1857, from One Hundred Famous Views of Edo

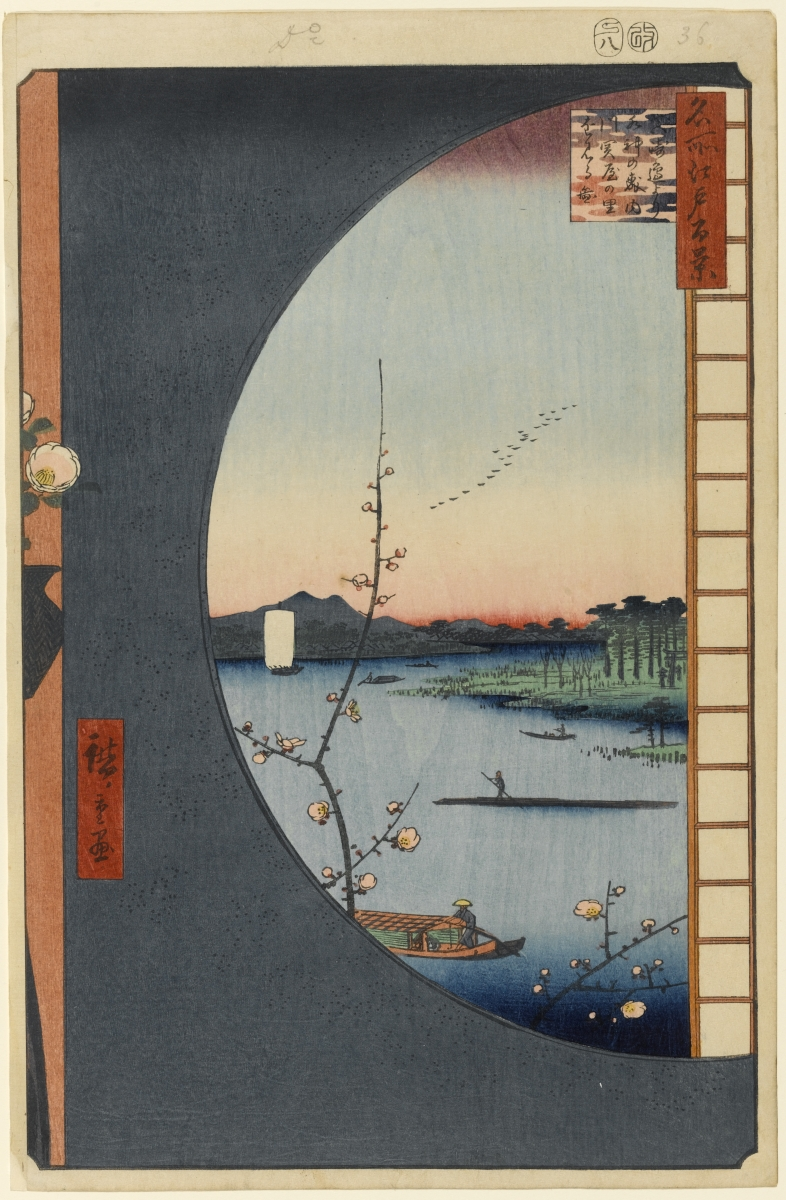
View from Massaki of Suijin Shrine, Uchigawa Inlet, and Sekiya, from One Hundred Famous Views of Edo

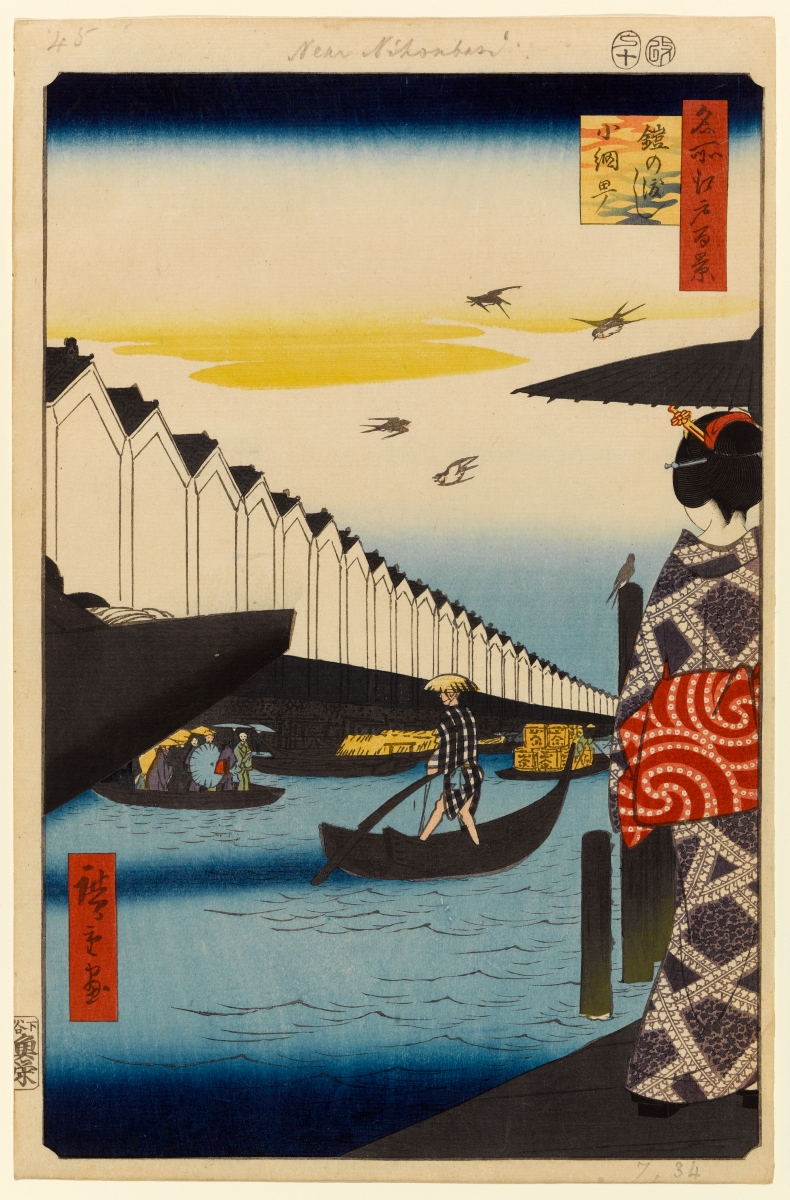
Yoroi Ferry, Koami-cho, from One Hundred Famous Views of Edo

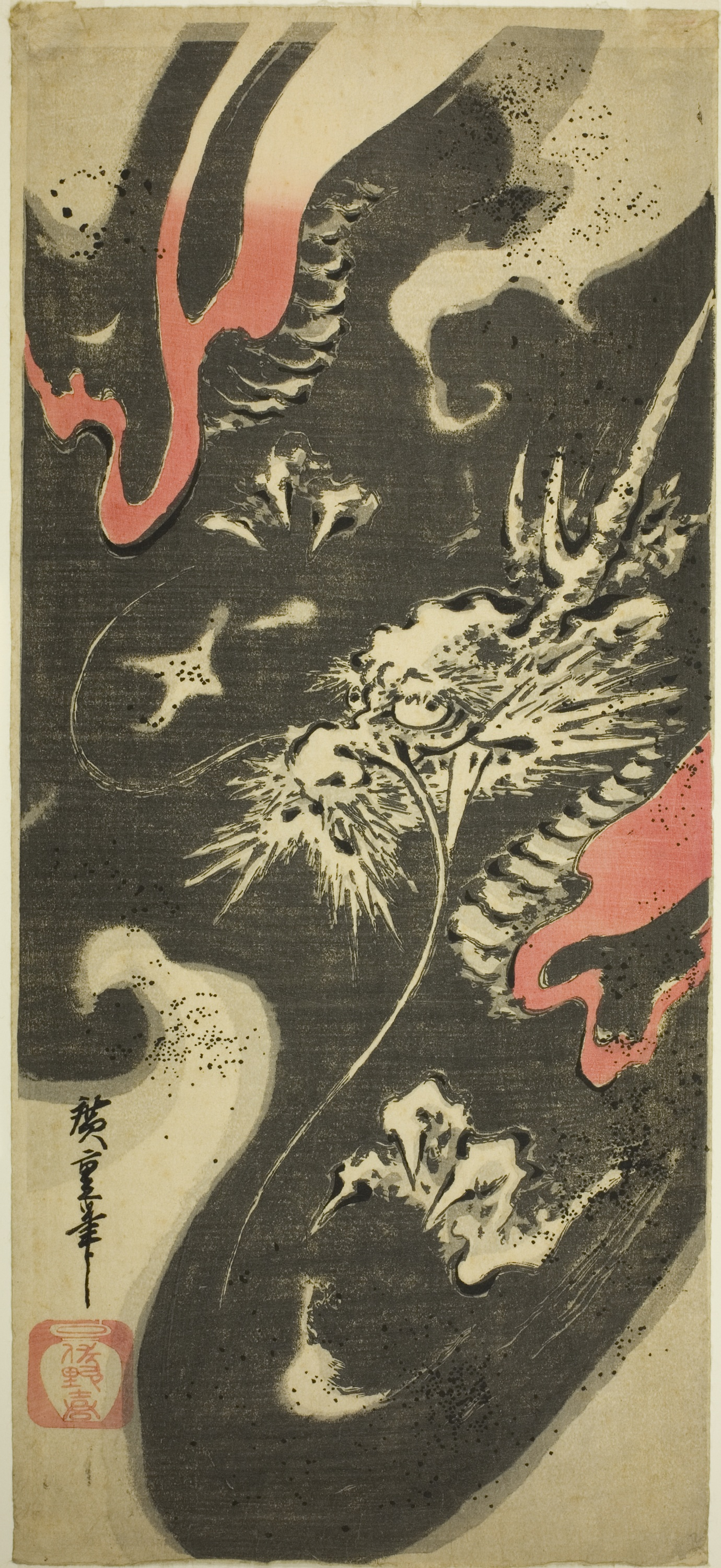
Dragon in clouds
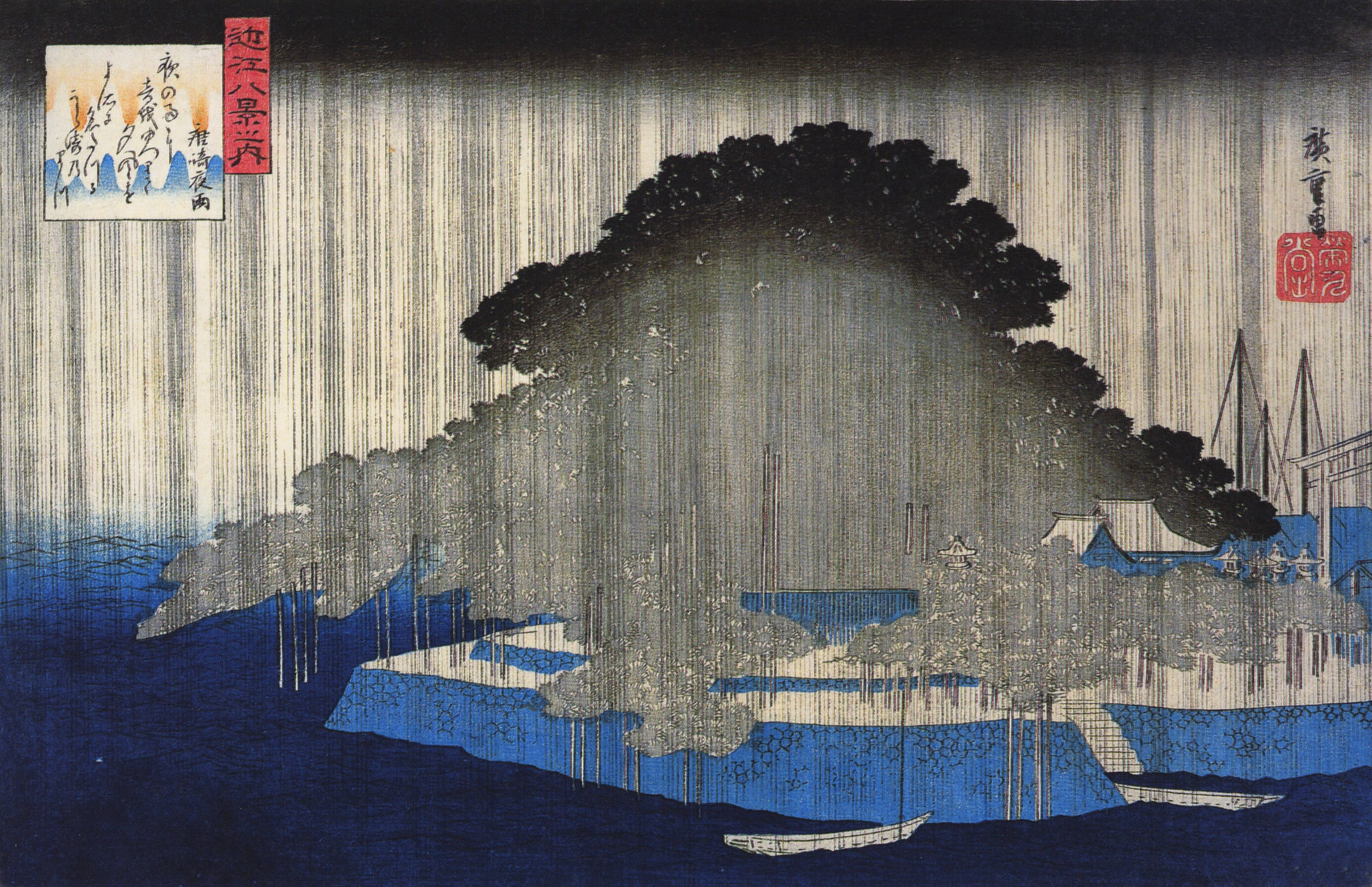
Heavy rain on a pine tree, from Eight Views of Ōmi

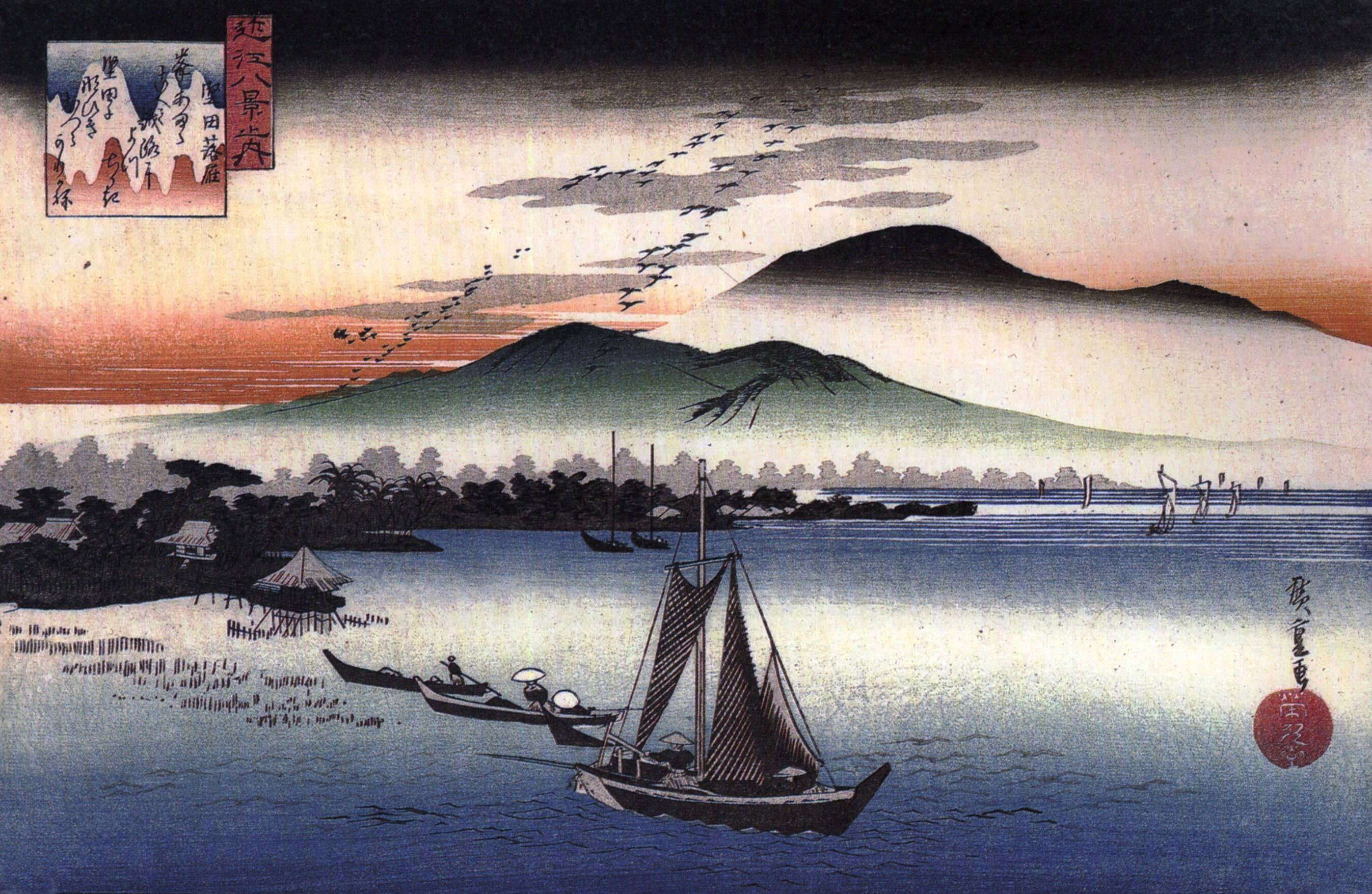
Fishing boats on a lake, from Eight Views of Ōmi

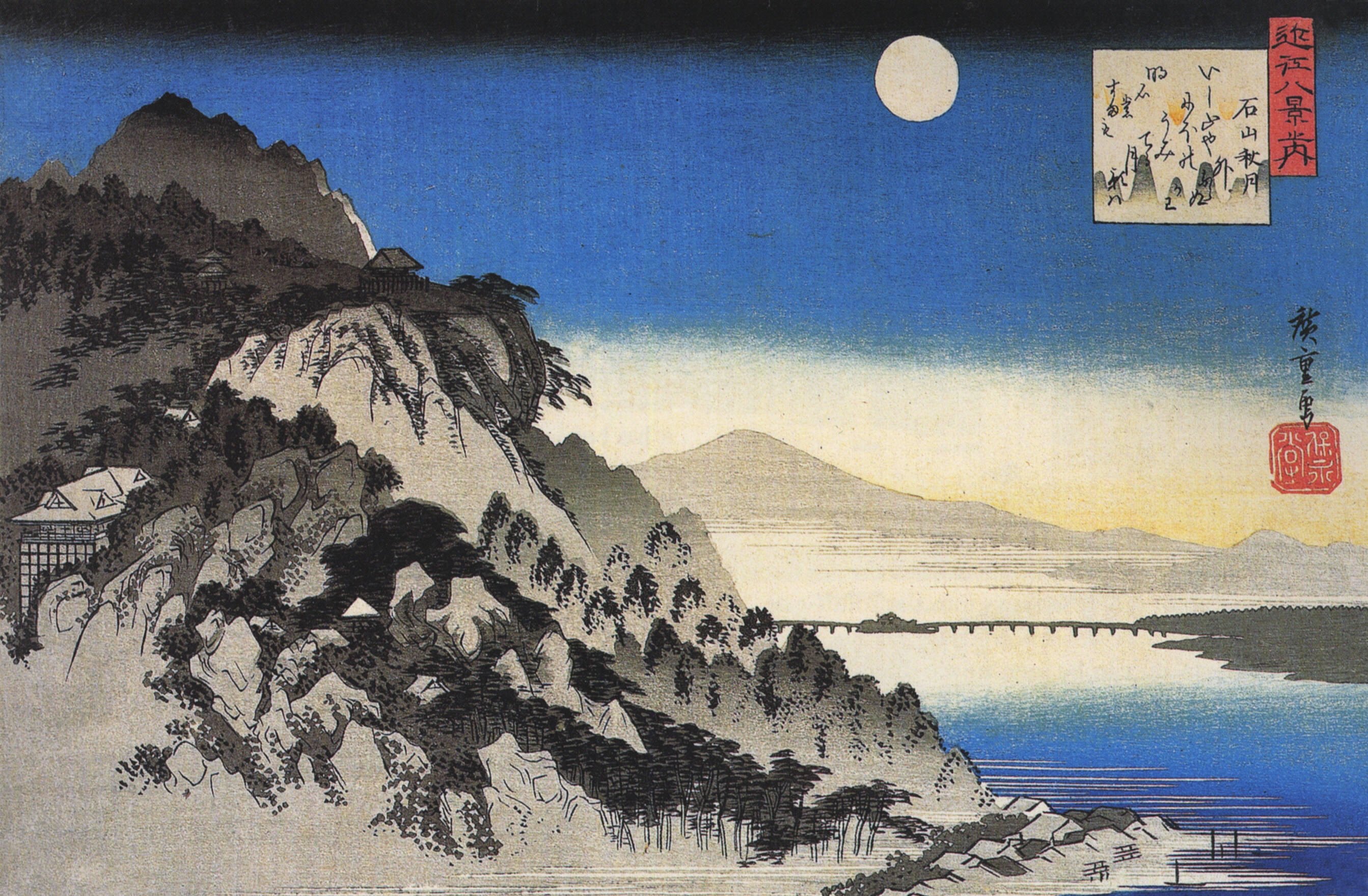
Full moon over a mountain landscape, from Eight Views of Ōmi

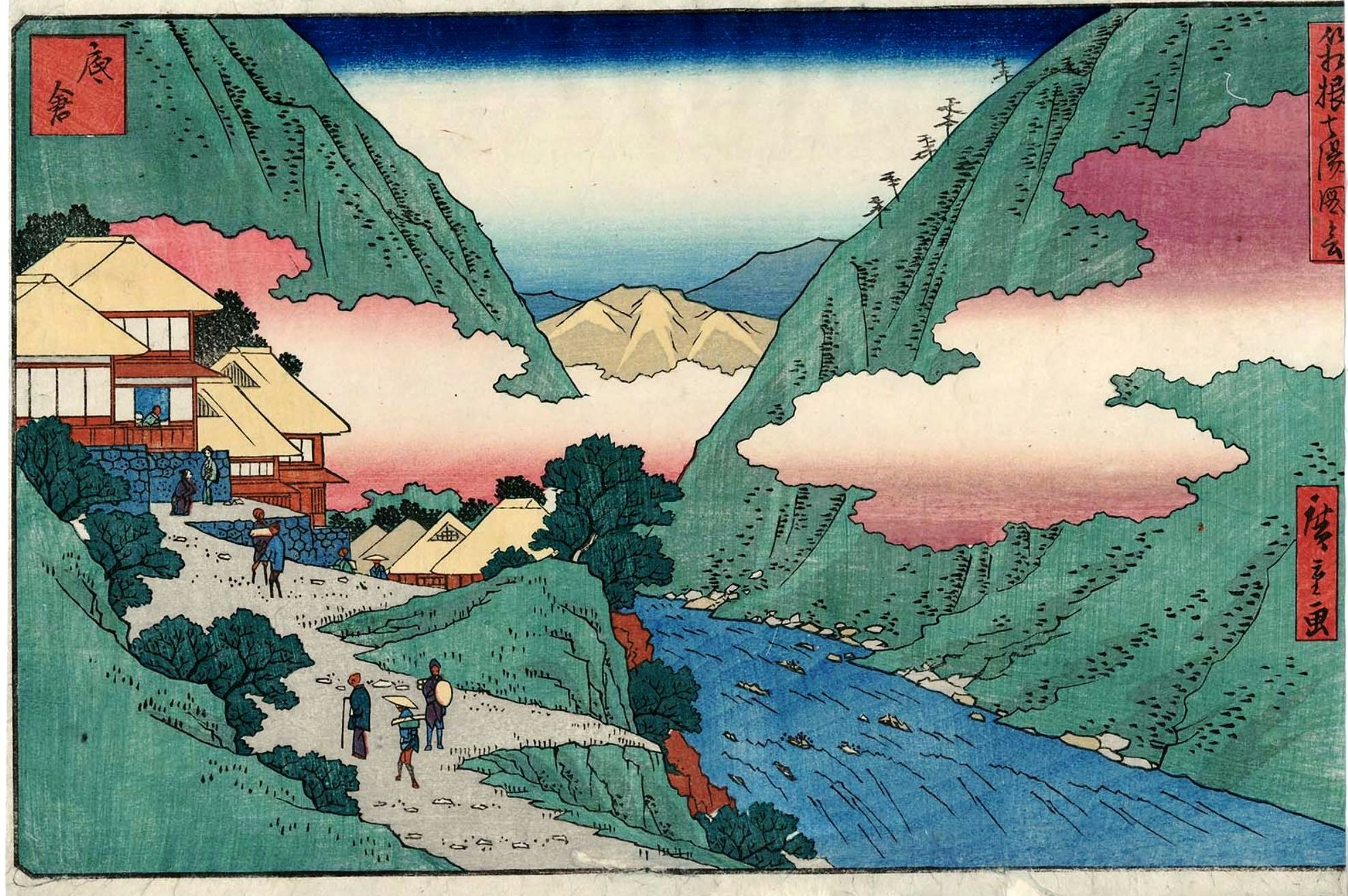
Sokokura, from Seven Hot Springs of Hakone

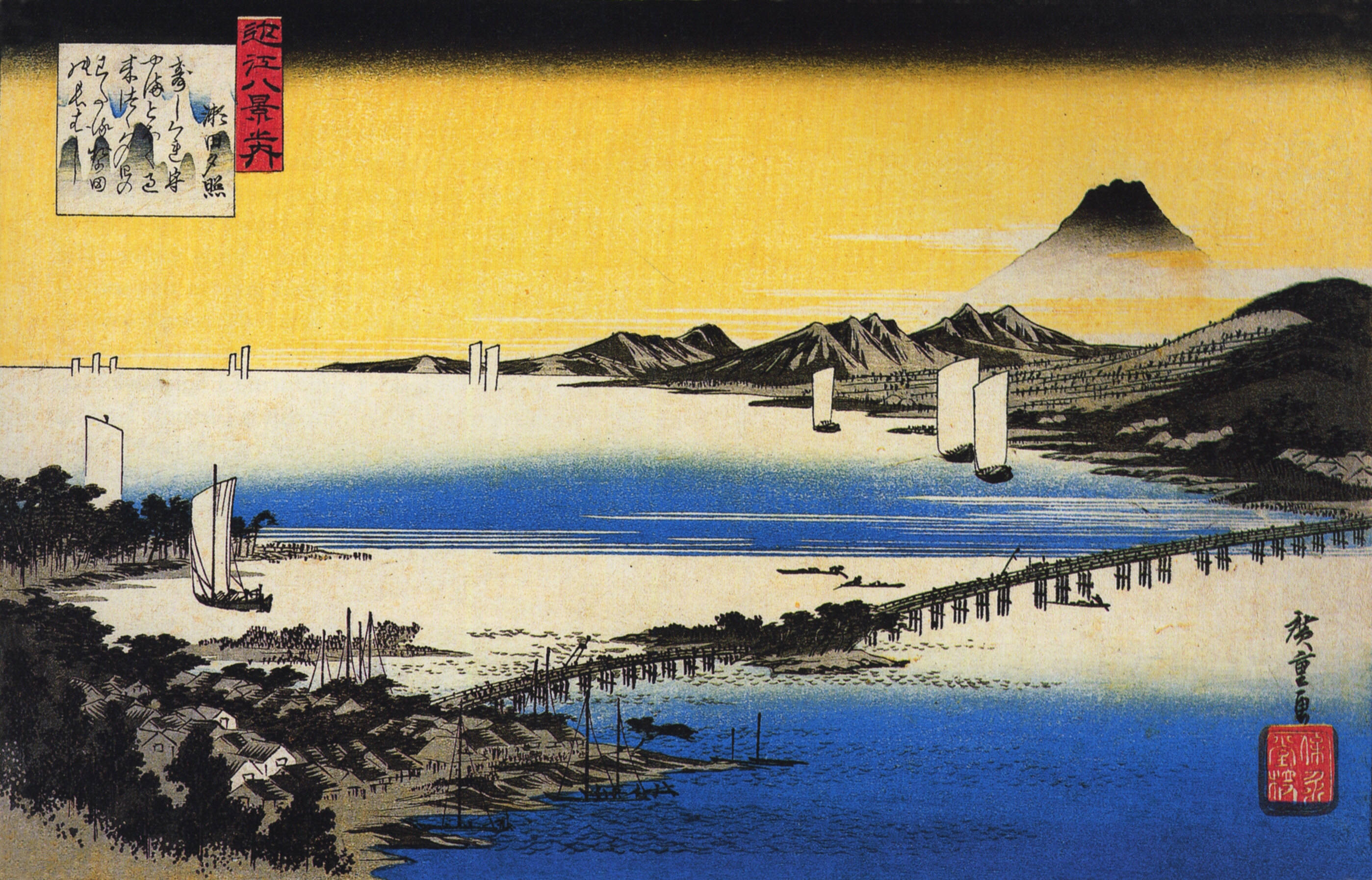
View of a long bridge across a lake, from Eight Views of Ōmi

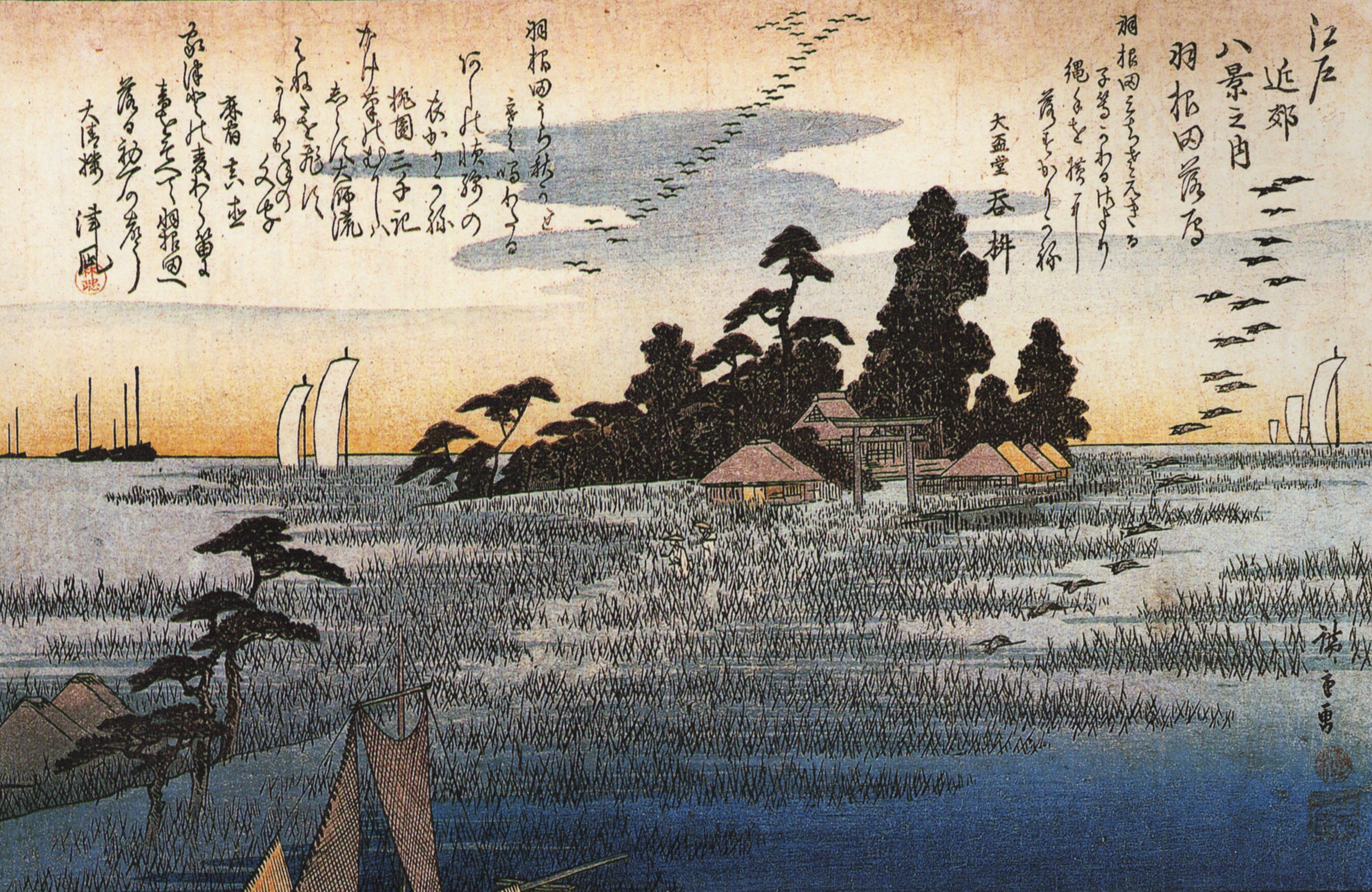
A shrine among trees on a moor

== See also ==
- List of Utagawa school members
- Category:Print series by Hiroshige

== Notes ==
=== References ===
- Forbes, Andrew; Henley, David (2014). 100 Famous Views of Edo. Chiang Mai: Cognoscenti Books. ASIN: B00HR3RHUY
- Forbes, Andrew; Henley, David (2014). Utagawa Hiroshige's 36 Views of Mount Fuji. Chiang Mai: Cognoscenti Books. ASIN: B00KD7CZ9O
- Forbes, Andrew; Henley, David (2014). Utagawa Hiroshige's 53 Stations of the Tokaido. Chiang Mai: Cognoscenti Books. ASIN: B00LM4APAI
- Noguchi, Yoné (1992). Selected English Writings of Yone Noguchi: Prose. Associated University Presse. ISBN 978-0-8386-3422-6.
- Oka, Isaburo (1992). Hiroshige: Japan's Great Landscape Artist. Kodansha. ISBN 9784770016584.
