= One Hundred Famous Views of Edo =

Series of 119 woodblock prints by Hiroshige

The Plum Garden in Kameido
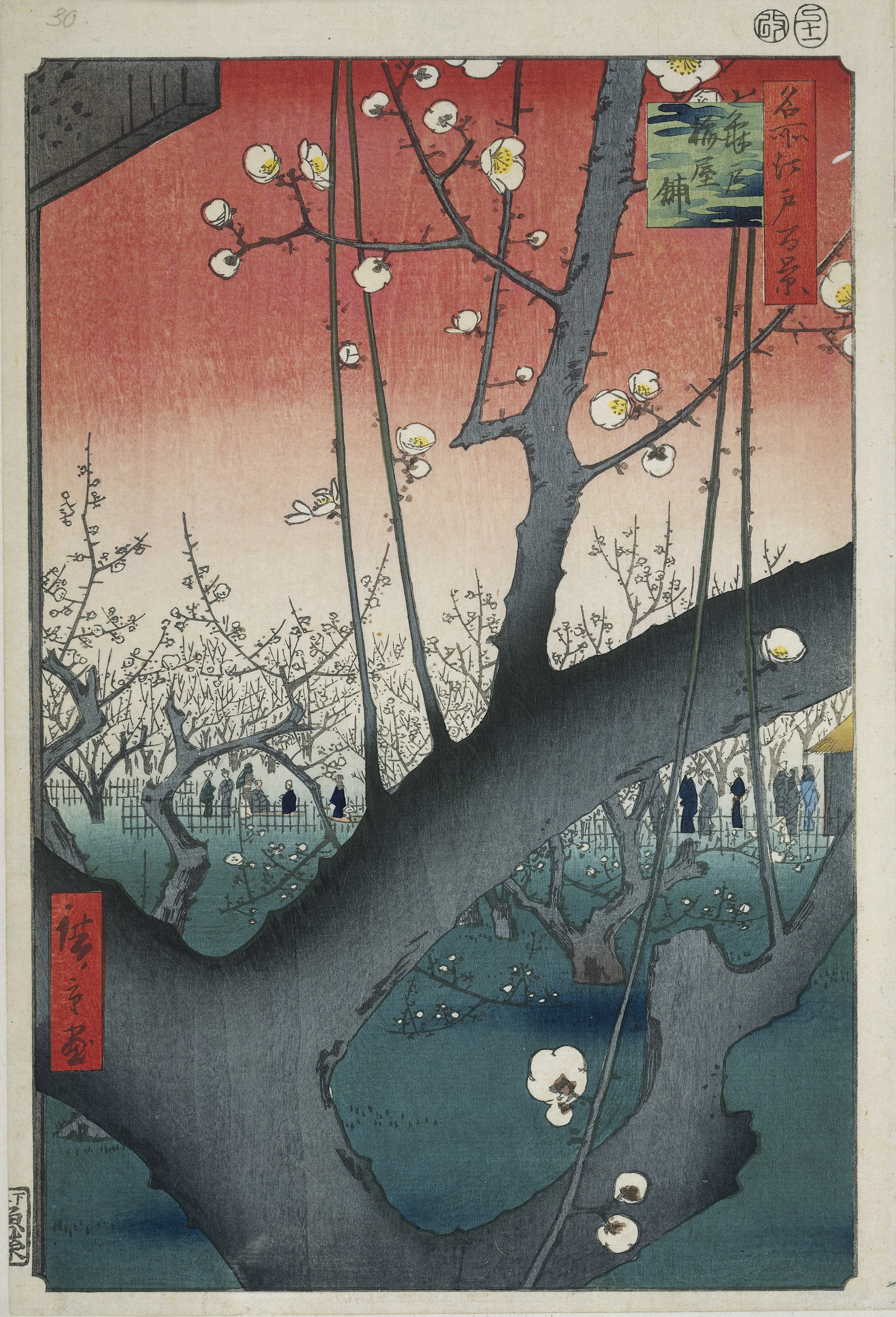
- Artist: Hiroshige
- Year: 1856–58
- Type: ukiyo-e

One Hundred Famous Views of Edo (in Japanese: 名所江戸百景, romanized: Meisho Edo Hyakkei) is a series of 119 ukiyo-e prints begun and largely completed by the Japanese artist Hiroshige (1797–1858), of Edo, the historical name for Tokyo. The prints were first published in serialized form in 1856–59, with Hiroshige II completing the series after Hiroshige's death. It was tremendously popular and much reprinted.

== History ==
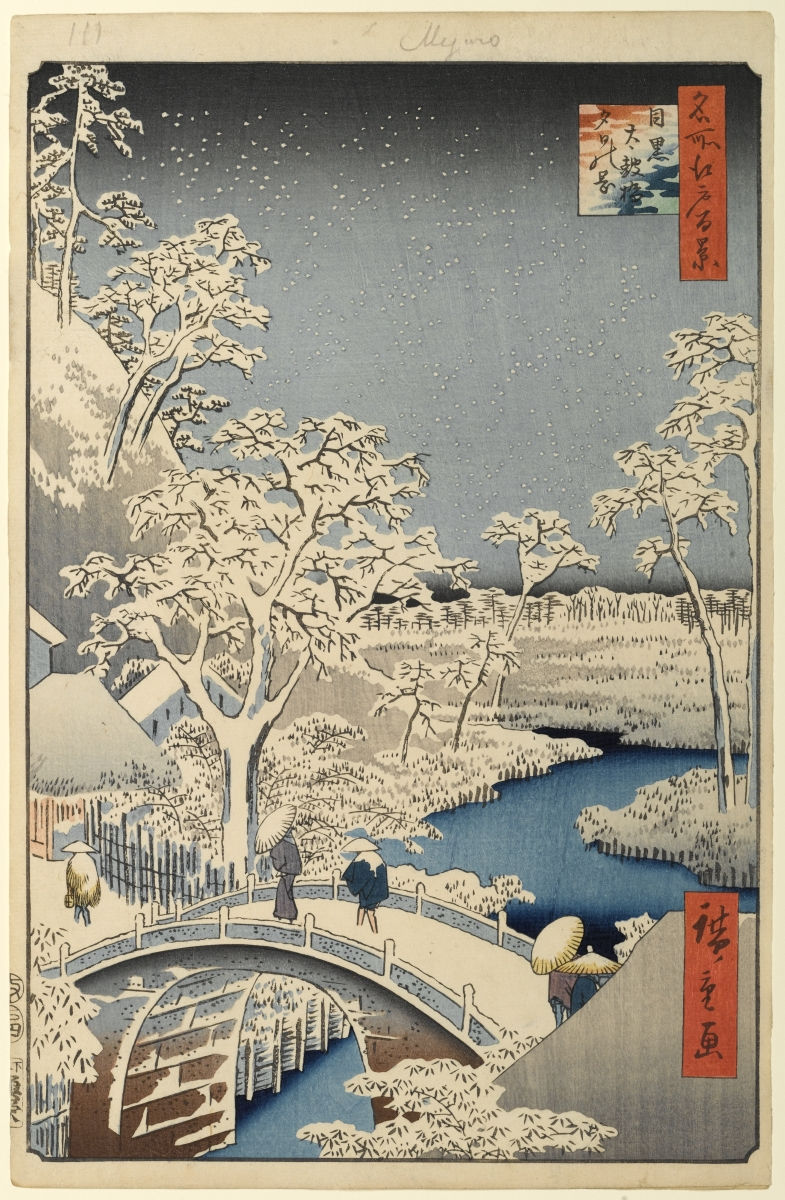
Drum bridge at Meguro and Sunset Hill, 1854 Hiroshige

Hiroshige produced designs in the style of the Utagawa school, a 19th-century popular style in woodblock prints, much favoured during his lifetime. Increasingly large series of prints were produced. This trend can be seen in Hiroshige’s work, such as The Fifty-three Stations of the Tōkaidō and The Sixty-nine Stations of the Kisokaidō.

Many publishing houses arose and grew, publishing both books and individual prints. A publisher's ownership of the physical woodblocks used to print a given text or image constituted the closest equivalent to a concept of "copyright" that existed at this time.

Woodblock prints such as these were produced in large numbers in 18th- and 19th-century Japan, created by artists, block cutters and printers working independently to the instructions of specialist publishers. Prints such as these were called ukiyo-e, which means 'pictures of the floating world'. This world was one of transient delights and changing fashions centred on the licensed pleasure districts and popular theatres found in the major cities of Japan.

In the years 1829–36, a seven volume illustrated guidebook Pictures of famous places of Edo (江戸名所図会, Edo meishō zue) was published. It was begun by Saitō Yukio (1737–1799) in 1790 and illustrated very accurately by Hasegawa Settan (1778–1848). The pictures and text describe the important temples and shrines, but also the famous stores, restaurants, tea-houses etc. of Edo as well as the Sumida river and its channels and surrounding landscape.

Hiroshige, in several cases, makes use of this guide for his series of colour prints (see below and within the list). His series covered the place too which the guide didn’t describe, and he drew casual views of Edo. His series is a work that inspired a number of Western artists, including Vincent van Gogh, to experiment with imitations of Japanese methods. Elements of Hiroshige's work can be found in Western cinema and comics produced during the 20th-century, particularly The Adventures of Tintin, and they "profoundly influenced" the development of modernism.

The series uses a vertical format which Hiroshige pioneered in his preceding series, Famous Views of the Sixty-odd Provinces, and was a departure from the horizontal format used in his previous major print series.

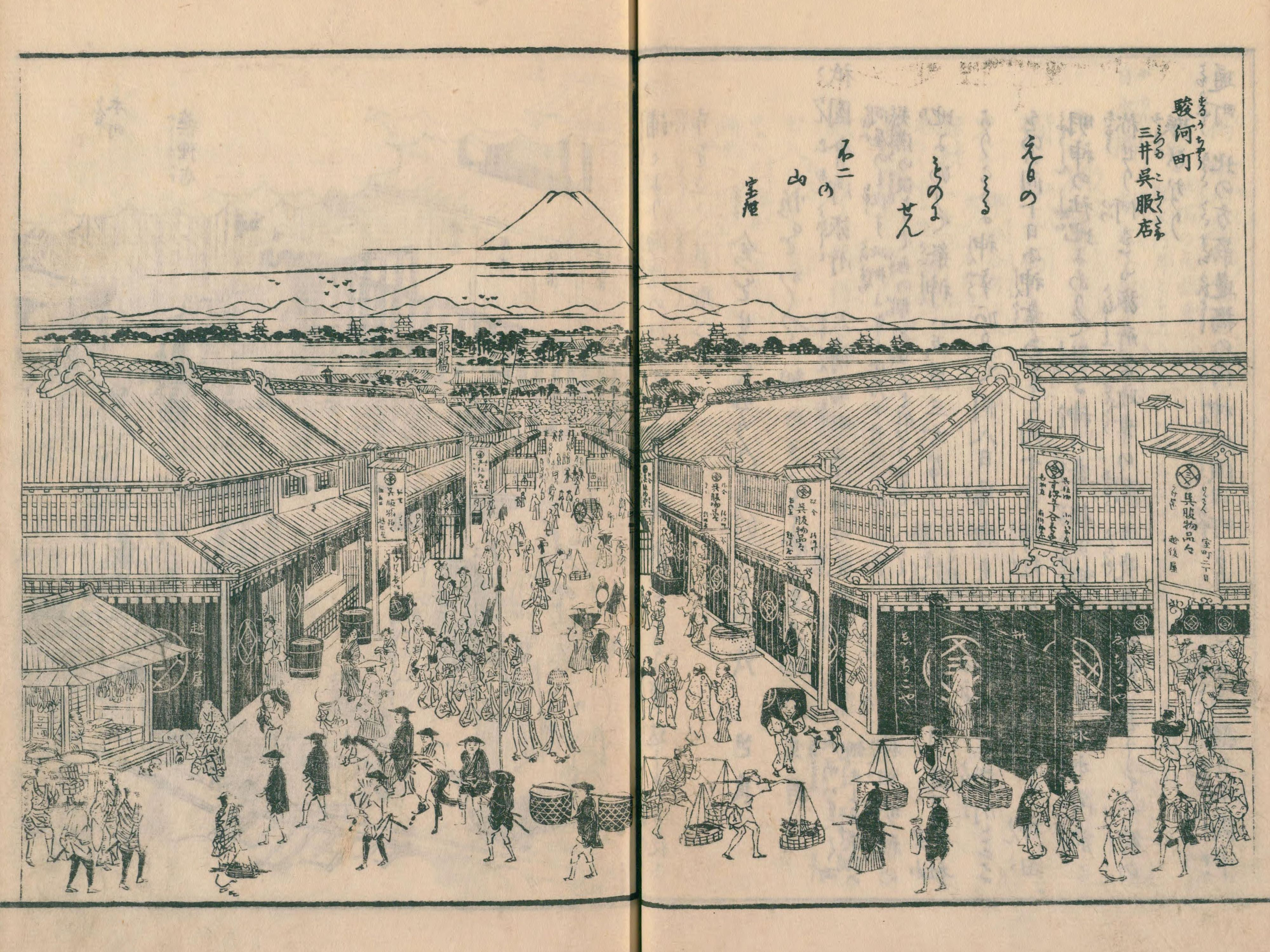
Suruga-chō by Hasegawa

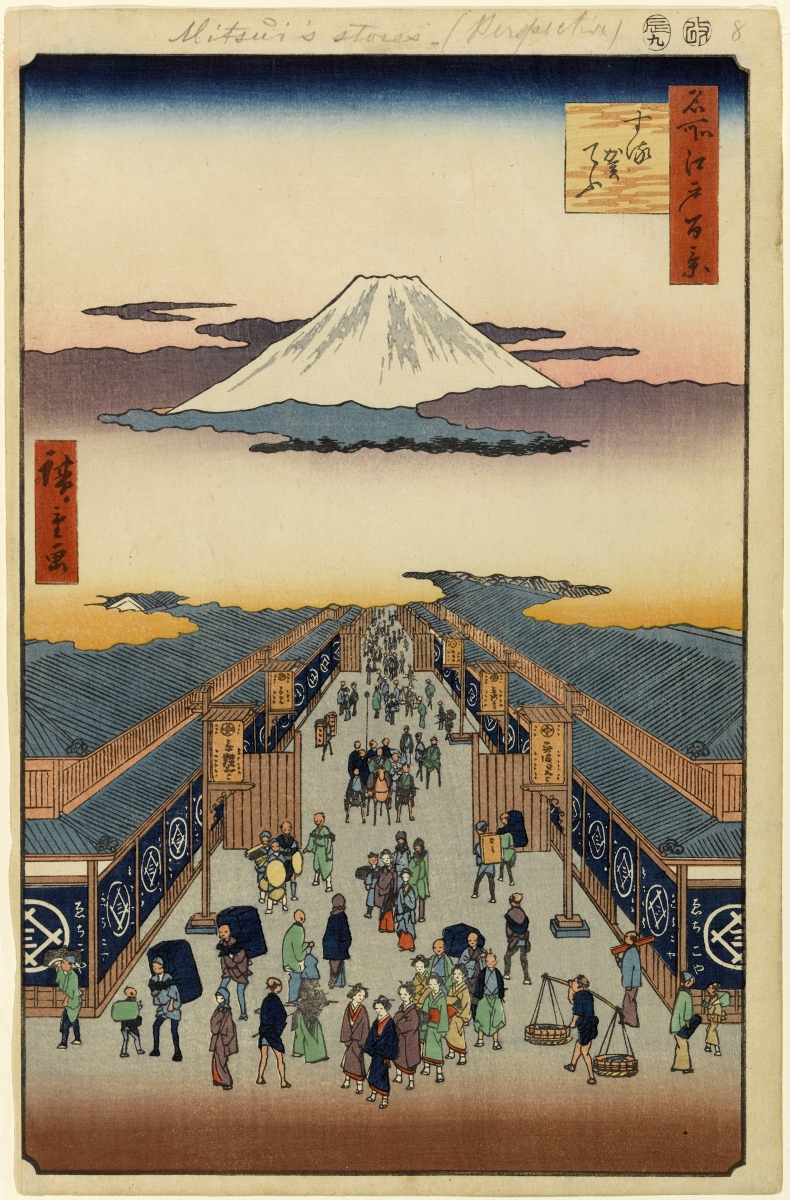
Suruga-chō by Hiroshige

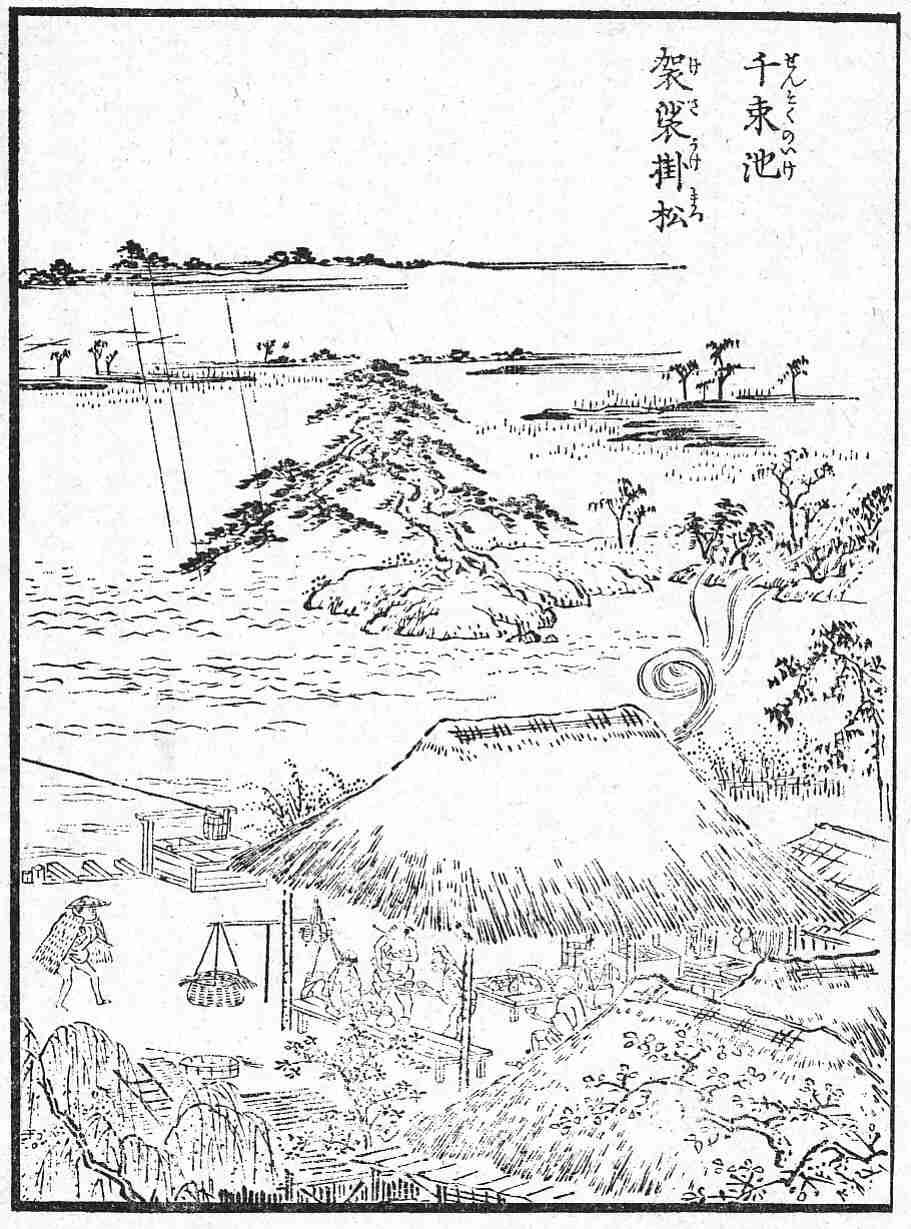
Senzoku pond
by Hasegawa

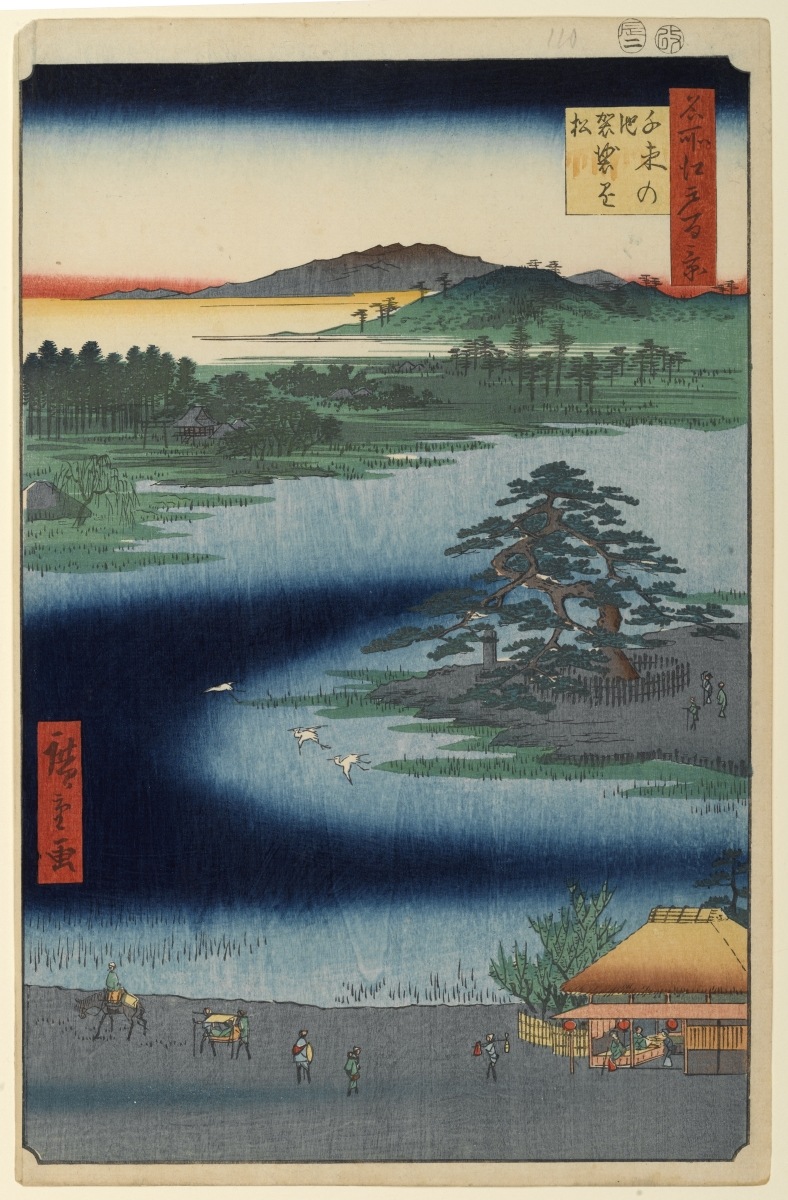
Senzoku pond
by Hiroshige

== Prints ==
=== Key ===
- No.: number of the print; an alternative order for the summer prints in parentheses (Note: The main order used in the table is according to (Smith (1986). One Hundred Famous Views of Edo.) and follows by reading the fan-shaped box for summer on the table of contents print in the way of "scattered writing" (chirashigaki), i.e. by grouping the titles in sets of three. The alternative order given in parentheses is generally found in early 20th century sources and follows by reading the fan shaped-box for the summer titles in the normal way, i.e. (vertical) line by line.)
- Title: as it appears on the print together with English translation and Japanese reading
- Depicted: major landmarks that appear in the print listed in order of increasing distance from the viewer
- Remarks: some general remarks on the print
- Date: publication year and month (in the pre-1873 Japanese lunisolar calendar) according to the date seal; intercalary months are preceded with "i"
- Location: place, ward (Note: For views that are not located within the modern Tokyo, the prefecture and city are listed.) and coordinates of the viewpoint
- Image: a picture of the print
Spring
Summer
Autumn
Winter

No.	Title	Depicted	Remarks	Date	Location	Image
—	Table of Contents	—	Abbreviated titles of prints arranged by season: two boxes at top are spring, fan-shaped box is summer, bottom right box autumn and bottom left are winter prints	—	—	
1	Nihonbashi: Clearing after Snow (日本橋雪晴, Nihonbashi yukibare)	Nihonbashi, Edo Castle, Mount Fuji	—	1856 / 5	Nihonbashi, Chūō; 35°41′2.5″N 139°46′28″E	
2	Kasumigaseki (霞がせき)	Street (today Kasumigaseki-zaka), guardhouse of residence of Asano, barracks of samurai of the Kuroda clan, Edo Bay	Kadomatsu gate pines and manzai dancers indicate a setting around New Year; kite with Japanese character for fish (Jap. "sakana") is a reference to the publisher of the series, Sakanaya Eikichi	1857 / 1	Kasumigaseki, Chiyoda; 35°40′32.4″N 139°44′56.3″E	
3	Hibiya and Soto-Sakurada from Yamashita-chō (山下町日比谷外さくら田, Yamashita-chō Hibiya Soto-Sakurada)	Residence of daimyō Nabeshima Kansō from the Saga Domain, outer moat of Edo Castle, Mount Fuji	Kadomatsu pine, hagoita and kites indicate a setting around New year	1857 / 12	Hibiya, Chūō; 35°40′20″N 139°45′39.7″E	
4	Tsukudajima and Eitai Bridge (永代橋佃しま, Eitaibashi Tsukudajima)	Eitai Bridge, Sumida River, fishing boats of Tsukudajima	An almost identical composition titled Eitaibashi by Hiroshige exists in the second volume of his "Illustrated Souvenirs of Edo"	1857 / 2	Tsukuda, Chūō; 35°40′39.4″N 139°47′14.7″E	
5	Ekōin Temple in Ryōgoku and Moto-Yanagi Bridge (両ごく回向院元柳橋, Ryōgoku Ekōin Moto-Yanagibashi)	Drum tower of Ekō-in, Honjo neighbourhood, Sumida River, residence of Matsudaira feudal lord of Tanba, Mount Fuji	Drum tower was associated with sumo tournaments held at Ekō-in; for marketing purposes the print appeared two months after a popular major exhibition of temple treasures at Ekō-in	1857 / i5	Ryōgoku, Sumida; 35°41′36″N 139°47′31″E	
6	Hatsune Riding Ground in Bakuro-chō (馬喰町初音の馬場, Bakuro-chō Hatsune no baba)	Hatsune Riding Ground and district's fire watch tower	Dyers of Konya-chō district using riding grounds to dry their cloths	1857 / 9	Nihonbashibakuro-chō, Chūō; 35°41′40.6″N 139°46′59.3″E	
7	Shops with Cotton Goods in Ōdenma-chō (大てんま町木綿店, Ōtenma-chō momendana)	Street scene with geishas, cotton shops in Ōdenma-chō	—	1858 / 4	Nihonbashiōdenma-chō, Chūō; 35°41′18.7″N 139°46′34.9″E	
8	Suruga-chō (する賀てふ, Suruga tefu)	Mitsui (yagō: Echigoya) textile stores, Mount Fuji	Echigoya later became the Mitsukoshi department store chain whose modern day headquarters are located on the left side of the street in the print	1856 / 9	Nihonbashimuro-machi, Chūō; 35°41′10.5″N 139°46′26.2″E	
9	Yatsukōji, Inside Sujikai Gate (筋違内八ツ小路, Sujikai uchi Yatsukōji)	Yatsukōji junction, Kanda River, Kanda Shrine	One of the few open spaces in Edo, created as fire-breaks	1857 / 11	Kandata-chō, Chiyoda; 35°41′50.5″N 139°46′9.2″E	
10	Sunrise at Kanda Myōjin Shrine (神田明神曙之景, Kanda Myōjin akebono no kei)	Kanda Shrine	Probably produced as a souvenir of the shrine festival in memory of the Battle of Sekigahara celebrated on the 15th day of the 9th month	1857 / 9	Soto-Kanda, Chiyoda; 35°42′7″N 139°46′4.5″E	
11	Kiyomizu Hall and Shinobazu Pond at Ueno (上野清水堂不忍ノ池, Ueno Kiyomizu-dō Shinobazu no ike)	Kiyomizu Hall of Kan'ei-ji, Moon Pine, Shinobazu Pond	Depicted pines are in reality much smaller	1856 / 4	Ueno, Taitō; 35°42′45.4″N 139°46′24.8″E	
12	Ueno Yamashita (上野山した)	Iseya restaurant, temples	Published in the month after Hiroshige's death; composition probably based on his sketches but probably completed by Hiroshige II	1858 / 10	Ueno, Taitō; 35°42′38″N 139°46′24.5″E	
13	Shitaya Hirokōji (下谷広小路)	Hirokōji ("Broadway"), premises of textile retailer Matsuzakaya	Published in the same month in which the depicted Matsuzakaya store re-opened after the 1855 earthquake	1856 / 9	Ueno, Taitō; 35°42′25.4″N 139°46′21.7″E	
14	Temple Gardens in Nippori (日暮里寺院の林泉, Nippori jiin no rinsen)	Temple Gardens	Depicts cherries and azaleas in bloom while in reality they bloom at different times of the year	1857 / 2	Nishinippori, Arakawa; 35°43′51.8″N 139°45′57.7″E	
15	Suwa Bluff in Nippori (日暮里諏訪の台, Nippori Suwanodai)	Suwa Myōjin Shrine grounds, Mount Tsukuba	—	1856 / 5	Nishinippori, Arakawa; 35°43′51.1″N 139°46′1.5″E	
16	Flower Park and Dangozaka Slope in Sendagi (千駄木団子坂花屋敷, Sendagi Dangozaka Hanayashiki)	Cherry orchard, Pavilion of the Violet Spring (Shisentei)	The print is a reference to the reconstruction of the Shisentai after the 1855 earthquake and to Tokugawa Iesada's visit to the park two months prior to publication	1856 / 5	Sendagi, Bunkyō; 35°43′30.5″N 139°45′40.4″E	
17	View to the North from Asukayama (飛鳥山北の眺望, Asukayama kita no chōbō)	Asukayama Park, Mount Tsukuba	Possibly inspired by Tokugawa Iesada's visit to the park two months prior to publication	1856 / 5	Asukayama Park, Kita; 35°45′5″N 139°44′18″E	
18	The Ōji Inari Shrine (王子稲荷の社, Ōji Inari no yashiro)	Ōji Inari Shrine, Mount Tsukuba	—	1857 / 9	Kishi-machi, Kita; 35°45′21.9″N 139°44′0″E	
19	Dam on the Otonashi River at Ōji, known as "The Great Waterfall" (王子音無川堰棣 世俗大瀧ト唱, Ōji Otonashigawa entei, sezoku Ōtaki to tonau)	Otonashi River, Amida Hall of Kinrin-ji temple, Takata-chō	Likely created to mark Tokugawa Iesada's visit to Kinrin-ji (Ōji Shrine) and Takata on the 21st day of the first month (also see no. 115, 116)	1857 / 2	Ōji, Kita; 35°45′8″N 139°44′8.7″E	
20	The Kawaguchi Ferry and Zenkōji temple (川口のわたし善光寺, Kawaguchi no watashi Zenkōji)	Arakawa River, Zenkō-ji temple	A year after Hiroshige designed the print, the Buddha in the Amida Hall at the top was due to be exhibited publicly for the first time in 13 years; in a pun Hiroshige covered the hall of this "secret Buddha" with the title cartouche	1857 / 2	Kita / Kawaguchi, Saitama; 35°47′38″N 139°43′16.7″E	
21	Mount Atago in Shiba (芝愛宕山, Shiba Atagoyama)	Atago Shrine, Edo Bay	Scene depicts an emissary from Enpuku-ji temple who on every third day of the year performs a ceremony at Atago Shrine for good fortune, health and success and to avert hunger and disease; the large rice paddle in his hand symbolizes abundance, the seaweed around his neck was distributed after the ceremony among the faithful who used it to brew an infusion against colds	1857 / 8	Atago, Minato; 35°39′53.2″N 139°44′54.4″E	
22	Hiroo on Furukawa River (広尾ふる川, Hiroo Furukawa)	Furukawa River, "Fox" (kitsune) restaurant	—	1856 / 7	Hiroo, Shibuya; 35°38′49.7″N 139°43′53.8″E	
23	Chiyogaike Pond in Meguro (目黒千代か池川, Meguro Chiyogaike)	Chiyogaike Pond	Feature a — for the time — unusual depiction of reflections of the trees in the water	1856 / 7	Meguro, Meguro; 35°38′15″N 139°42′46″E	
24	New Fuji in Meguro (目黒新富士, Meguro Shin-Fuji)	Mita Aqueduct, Mount Fuji replica, Mount Fuji	Subject is a replica (one of many) of Mount Fuji erected in 1829 by Fuji worshippers	1857 / 4	Nakameguro, Meguro; 35°38′36.5″N 139°42′17.5″E	
25	The Original Fuji in Meguro (目黒元不二, Meguro Moto-Fuji)	Mount Fuji replica, Mount Fuji	Fuji replica erected in 1812 was at 12 m (39 ft) the tallest in Edo; this print was incorrectly placed in the spring section of the table of contents since the depicted cherry trees are in autumn foliage; spelling of "Fuji" in the title as (不二; lit. "not two") is thought to be a pun on the doubling of the mountain	1857 / 4	Kamimeguro, Meguro; 35°38′48″N 139°42′3.7″E	
26	The "Armour-Hanging Pine" at Hakkeizaka Bluff (八景坂鎧掛松, Hakkeizaka Yoroikakematsu)	Tōkaidō, Edo Bay	Depicts a popular viewpoint of Edo Bay; according to legend, Minamoto no Yoshiie hung his armour on this tree in 1062; Hiroshige adapts the shape of the tree so that only a giant could have hung his armour on it	1856 / 5	Ōmorikita, Ōta; 35°35′18.6″N 139°43′36.7″E	
27	Plum Orchard in Kamada (蒲田の梅園, Kamada no umezono)	Plum Orchard in Kamada	—	1857 / 2	Kamata, Ōta; 35°33′53″N 139°43′37″E	
28	Palace Hill in Shinagawa (品川御殿やま, Shinagawa Gotenyama)	Palace Hill	Depicts both a famous cherry blossom spot and the destruction of the landscape after removal of earth; the earth was used to build ramparts (daiba) in the sea following Commodore Perry's arrival in Edo Bay in 1853	1856 / 4	Kita-shinagawa, Shibuya 35°37′15.7″N 139°44′22.2″E	
29	Moto-Hachiman Shrine in Sunamura (砂むら元八まん, Sunamura Moto-Hachiman)	Torii of Moto-Hachiman Shrine, Edo Bay	—	1856 / 4	Minami-suna, Kōtō; 35°40′9.4″N 139°50′15.6″E	
30	Plum Park in Kameido (亀戸梅屋舗, Kameido Umeyashiki)	Plum Park in Kameido	Both in color and theme this print is related to print no. 27 (Plum Orchard in Kamada); copied by Vincent van Gogh under the title Japonaiserie: Flowering Plum Tree	1857 / 11	Kameido, Kōtō; 35°42′16.3″N 139°49′26.1″E	
31	Azuma no mori Shrine and the Entwined Camphor (吾嬬の森連理の梓, Azuma no mori Renri no azusa)	Azuma Shrine	—	1856 / 7	Tachibana, Sumida; 35°42′19.9″N 139°49′36.4″E	
32	The Yanagishima (柳しま, Yanagishima)	Myōken Hall of Hōshō-ji temple, Hashimotoya restaurant ("At the Foot of the Bridge"), Mount Tsukuba	—	1857 / 4	Narihira, Sumida; 35°42′27.3″N 139°49′5.9″E	
33	Towboats Along the Yotsugi-dōri Canal (四ツ木通用水引ふね, Yotsugi dōri yōsui hikifune)	Yotsugi-dōri Canal towpath	Unlike in the print, the canal and towpath were absolutely straight	1857 / 2	Yotsugi, Katsushika; 35°44′7.7″N 139°50′4″E	
34	Night View of Matsuchiyama and the San'ya Canal (真乳山山谷堀夜景, Matsuchiyama San'yabori yakei)	Sumida River, San'ya Canal inlet, Yumeiro and Takeya restaurants, Matsuchiyama hill, Shōten Shrine	Only image in the series to depict a large human figure, purportedly the favourite geisha of Hiroshige; Shōten Shrine on the top of the hill has sexual connotations	1857 / 8	Asakusa, Taitō; 35°42′57.3″N 139°48′23.3″E	
35	Suijin Shrine and Massaki on the Sumida River (隅田川水神の森真崎, Sumidagawa Suijin no mori Massaki)	Cherry tree trunk, Suijin Shrine, Sumida River, Massaki district, Mount Tsukuba	People at the bottom of the print are on the way to the Hashiba ferry (see no. 37)	1856 / 8	Tsutsumidōri, Sumida and Minamisenju, Arakawa; 35°43′58″N 139°48′45.8″E	
36	View From Massaki of Suijin Shrine, Uchigawa Inlet, and Sekiya (真崎辺より水神の森内川関屋の里を見る図, Massaki atari yori Suijin no mori Uchigawa Sekiya no sato wo miru zu)	Sumida River, Suijin Shrine, Massaki district, Mount Tsukuba	Similar subject and location as no. 35	1857 / 8	Minamisenju, Arakawa; 35°43′47″N 139°48′30.3″E	
37	Kilns and the Hashiba Ferry on the Sumida River (墨田河橋場の渡かわら竈, Sumidagawa hashiba no watashi kawaragama)	Kilns, Sumida River, Suijin Shrine, Mount Tsukuba	Similar area as no. 35, 36	1857 / 4	Minamisenju, Arakawa / Hashiba, Taitō / Tsutsumidōri, Sumida; 35°43′41″N 139°48′35″E	
38	Dawn Inside the Yoshiwara (廓中東雲, Kakuchū shinonome)	Yoshiwara	Published two months prior to the reopening of Yoshiwara after it burnt down in the 1855 earthquake; Hiroshige may have submitted this design and title following the suicide of two courtesans and their two lovers at dawn of the 19th day of the 4th month of 1857	1857 / 4	Asakusa, Taitō; 35°43′27.2″N 139°47′45.9″E	
39	Distant View of Kinryūzan Temple and the Azuma Bridge (吾妻橋金龍山遠望, Azumabashi Kinryūzan enbo)	Sumida River, Azuma Bridge, Kinryūzan Temple, Mount Fuji	—	1857 / 8	Asakusa, Taitō; 35°42′52″N 139°48′15″E	
40	Bashō's Hermitage on Camellia Hill beside the Aqueduct at Sekiguchi (せき口上水端はせを庵椿やま, Sekiguchi jōsuibata Bashōan Tsubakiyama)	Sekiguchi Aqueduct, Bashō's Hermitage	—	1857 / 4	Sekiguchi, Bunkyō; 35°42′44.3″N 139°43′24.6″E	
41	Hachiman Shrine in Ichigaya (市ヶ谷八幡, Ichigaya Hachiman)	Ichigaya moat, shopping street, Hachiman Shrine	Dated one month after Hiroshige's death and therefore attributed to Hiroshige II by some art historians	1858 / 10	Ichigayahachiman-chō, Shinjuku; 35°41′33.8″N 139°44′1.5″E	
42	Cherry Blossoms on the Banks of the Tama River (玉川堤の花, Tamagawa tsutsumi no hana)	Actually, the Tama River-Jōsui channel is depicted, with cherry trees far outside Edo	One of the first five prints sanctioned by the censors	1856 / 2	Shinjuku, Shinjuku; 35°41′21.6″N 139°42′8″E	
43	Nihonbashi Bridge and Edobashi Bridge (日本橋江戸ばし, Nihonbashi Edobashi)	Nihonbashi, Nihonbashi River, Edobashi	Fish barrel with first bonito of the season represents early summer	1857 / 12	Nihonbashi, Chūō; 35°41′3.2″N 139°46′28.8″E	
44	View of Nihonbashi itchōme Street (日本橋通一丁目略図, Nihonbashi Tōri itchōme ryakuzu)	Nihonbashi itchōme Street	Shirokiya shop on the right developed into one of the city's largest department stores and finally became part of the Tokyu Group	1858 / 8	Nihonbashi, Chūō; 35°40′57″N 139°46′23.7″E	
45 (62)	Yatsumi Bridge (八ツ見のはし, Yatsumi no hashi)	Yatsumi Bridge, Edo Castle, Mount Fuji	—	1856 / 8	Yaesu and Nihonbashihongoku-chō, Chūō; 35°41′4.7″N 139°46′16.8″E	
46 (45)	Yoroi Ferry, Koami-chō (鎧の渡し小網町, Yoroi no watashi Koami-chō)	Nihonbashi River, Yoroi ferry	—	1857 / 10	Nihonbashikoami-chō, Chūō; 35°40′56.1″N 139°46′47.9″E	
47 (46)	Seidō and Kanda River from Shōhei Bridge (昌平橋聖堂神田川, Shōheibashi Seidō Kandagawa)	Shōhei Bridge, Shōheizaka hill, Kanda River, wall of Yushima Seidō	Exaggerated size of hill on left	1857 / 9	Yushima, Bunkyō; 35°41′54″N 139°46′8″E	
48 (63)	Suidō Bridge and the Surugadai Quarter (水道橋駿河台, Suidōbashi Surugadai)	View from Surugadai, Kanda River, Suidō Bridge, Edo Castle, Mount Fuji	Koinobori carp streamers place the scene around the Boy's festival on the 5th day of the 5th month, the same month as the print was approved by the censors	1857 / i5	Surugadai, Chiyoda; 35°42′7.5″N 139°45′19″E	
49 (47)	Fudō Falls in Ōji (王子不動之滝, Ōji Fudō no taki)	Fudō Falls	Hasegawa Settan	1857 / 9	Ōji, Kita; 35°45′6″N 139°44′0.6″E	
50 (64)	Kumano Jūnisha Shrine at Tsunohazu, known as "Jūnisō" (角筈熊野十二社 俗称十二そう, Tsunohazu Kumano Jūnisha zokushō Jūnisō)	Kumano Jūnisha Shrine	—	1856 / 7	Nishi-Shinjuku, Shinjuku; 35°41′25.5″N 139°41′17.5″E	
51 (65)	The Sannō Festival Procession at Kōjimachi itchōme (糀町一丁目山王祭ねり込, Kōjimachi itchōme Sannō Matsuri nerikomi)	Moat and Hanzōmon Gate of Edo Castle	Sannō Festival was held one month prior to the approval of the print	1856 / 7	Kōjimachi, Chiyoda; 35°40′53″N 139°44′41.5″E	
52 (48)	The Paulownia Garden at Akasaka (赤坂桐畑, Akasaka Kiribatake)	Paulownia Garden, Tameike Pond, Hie Shrine, residence of daimyō Kuroda from Fukuoka	Hie Shrine is location for the Sannō Festival (see no. 51)	1856 / 4	Akasaka, Minato; 35°40′27″N 139°44′16.5″E	
53 (49)	The Pagoda of Zōjōji Temple and Akabane (増上寺塔赤羽根, Zōjōjitō Akabane)	Zōjō-ji, Akabane Bridge, residence of daimyō Arima from Kurume	—	1857 / 1	Shibakōen, Minato; 35°39′16.7″N 139°44′51″E	
54 (66)	The Benkei Moat from Soto-Sakurada to Kōjimachi (外桜田弁慶堀糀町, Soto-Sakurada Benkeibori Kōjimachi)	South-west embankment and moat of Edo Castle, residence of daimyō Ii from the Hikone Domain, Kōjimachi watchtower	Kōjimachi watchtower had been restored two months prior to publication after burning down in the 1855 earthquake	1856 / 5	Kōjimachi, Chiyoda; 35°40′38.3″N 139°45′2.2″E	
55 (50)	The Sumiyoshi Festival at Tsukudajima (佃しま住吉の祭, Tsukudajima Sumiyoshi no matsuri)	Tsukudajima Island	The Sumiyoshi Festival is held on the 29th of the sixth month, i.e., in the month prior to publication of this print; writer of the inscription is identified on the banner as the creator of the table of contents of this series, Seikengū Gengyo	1857 / 7	Tsukuda, Chūō; 35°40′4.8″N 139°47′0″E	
56 (51)	Mannen Bridge in Fukagawa (深川萬年橋, Fukagawa Mannenbashi)	Mannen Bridge, Mount Fuji	A turtle hanging from tub's handle use for Life release.	1857 / 11	Tokiwa / Kiyosumi, Kōtō; 35°41′0.5″N 139°47′38.8″E	
57 (67)	Mitsumata Wakarenofuchi (みつまたわかれの淵)	Sumida River, Mount Fuji	Reed-covered sandbank alludes to the artificial Nakazu island, location of a famous 18th-century pleasure district that was demolished in the course of the Kansei Reforms	1857 / 2	Nihonbashinakasu, Chūō; 35°40′55.3″N 139°47′27″E	
58 (52)	Sudden Shower over Shin-Ōhashi bridge and Atake (大はしあたけの夕立, Ōhashi atake no yūdachi)	Shin-Ōhashi bridge, Sumida River, Atake district	Considered to be a masterpiece and possibly Hiroshige's most famous work; copied by Vincent van Gogh	1857 / 9	Nihonbashihama-chō, Chūō; 35°41′7″N 139°47′35″E	
59 (53)	Ryōgoku Bridge and the Great Riverbank (両国橋大川ばた, Ryōgokubashi Ōkawabata)	Sumida River, Ryōgoku Bridge	At the time Japan's largest bridge	1856 / 8	Higashi-nihonbashi, Chūō / Ryōgoku, Sumida35°41′35″N 139°47′15.7″E	
60 (68)	Asakusa River, Miyato River, Great Riverbank (浅草川大川端宮戸川, Asakusagawa Ōkawabata Miyatogawa)	Sumida River, Mount Tsukuba	Depicts pilgrimage to Mount Ōyama, the pilgrim's return from the mountain is shown in no. 76; names in title are synonymous names for the depicted section of the Sumida River; in later prints, the title was simplified to: In Boats at Ryōgoku with a distant View of Asakusa	1857 / 7	Tsukuda, Chūō; 35°41′38.3″N 139°47′16.4″E	
61 (54)	The "Pine of Success" and Oumayagashi on the Asakusa River (浅草川首尾の松御厩河岸, Asakusagawa shubi no matsu Oumayagashi)	Sumida River, Oumayagashi ferry	Hiroshige's "Illustrated Souvenirs of Edo" contains a mirror image of this view with a woman standing upright in the boat	1856 / 8	Kuramae, Taitō; 35°42′2″N 139°47′31.8″E	
62 (55)	Komakata Hall and Azuma Bridge (駒形堂吾嬬橋, Komakatadō Azumabashi)	Komakata Hall, Sumida River, Azuma Bridge, Asakusa district	Lesser cuckoo (hototogisu) and Komakata Hall in the print allude to a 17th-century love poem attributed to Takao II, courtesan and lover of Date Tsunamune: Are you now, my love, near Komakata? Cry of the cuckoo!" (Note: In Japanese poetry the cry of the cuckoo is a symbol of longing and loneliness.)	1857 / 1	Asakusa, Taitō; 35°42′32.3″N 139°47′48.3″E	
63 (69)	The Ayase River and Kanegafuchi (綾瀬川鐘か淵, Ayasegawa Kanegafuchi)	Sumida River, Ayase River	Northernmost point of the Sumida river depicted in this series	1857 / 1	Senjuakebono-chō, Adachi; 35°44′23″N 139°48′55″E	
64 (56)	Horikiri Iris Garden (堀切の花菖蒲, Horikiri no hanashōbu)	Horikiri Iris Garden	Influenced European Art Nouveau	1857 / i5	Horikiri, Katsushika	
65 (57)	Inside Kameido Tenjin Shrine (亀戸天神境内, Kameidō Tenjin keidai)	Drum bridge and garden at Kameido Tenjin Shrine	Flowering wisteria indicates summer season	1856 / 7	Kameido, Kōtō; 35°42′7.9″N 139°49′15.5″E	
66 (70)	The Sazaidō Hall at the Five Hundred Rakan Temple (五百羅漢さゞゐ堂, Gohyaku Rakan Sazaidō)	Sazaidō Hall	—	1857 / 8	Ōshima, Kōtō; 35°41′22.5″N 139°49′36″E	
67 (58)	The Ferry at Sakasai (逆井のわたし, Sasakai no watashi)	Nakagawa River	—	1857 / 2	Kameido, Kōtō / Hirai, Edogawa; 35°41′42.5″N 139°50′51.3″E	
68 (59)	Open Garden at the Hachiman Shrine in Fukagawa (深川八まん山ひらき, Fukagawa Hachiman yamahiraki)	Garden at Hachiman Shrine	Print shows both azaleas and cherry trees in blossom which is unnatural for Edo; hill in the back is one of many miniature Mount Fuji that were scattered all over Edo	1857 / 8	Tomioka, Kōtō; 35°40′23″N 139°47′51″E	
69 (71)	Sanjusangendō Hall in Fukagawa (深川三十三間堂, Fukagawa Sanjusangendō)	Sanjusangendō, Kiba lumberyards (see no. 106)	About half of the hall is depicted	1857 / 8	Tomioka, Kōtō; 35°40′17.9″N 139°48′5.3″E	
70 (60)	The mouth of the Nakagawa River (中川口, Nakagawaguchi)	Onagigawa Canal, Nakagawa River, Shinkawa Canal	Nakagawa River is the broad waterway in the middle running left-right (Note: Its mouth (into Edo Bay) is not depicted in the print)	1857 / 2	Higashisuna, Kōtō; 35°41′11″N 139°50′48″E	
71 (61)	Scattered Pines on the Tone River (利根川ばらばらまつ, Tonegawa barabara-matsu)	Tone River	—	1856 / 8	Higashi-kasai, Edogawa; 35°40′40″N 139°53′11″E	
72	The Ferry at Haneda and the Benten Shrine (はねたのわたし弁天の社, Haneda no watashi Benten no yashiro)	Tama River, Benten Shrine, Edo Bay	The ground of the Benten Shrine is now occupied by Haneda Airport	1858 / 8	Haneda, Ōta; 35°32′36″N 139°44′35″E	
73	The City Flourishing, the Tanabata Festival (市中繁栄七夕祭, Shichū han'ei Tanabata matsuri)	Edo Castle, Mount Fuji	Arguably shows the view from Hiroshige's house; only print in series without a place name in the title	1857 / 7	Kyōbashi, Chūō; 35°40′41″N 139°46′21″E	
74	Silk Shops in Ōdenma-chō (大伝馬町ごふく店, Ōdenma-chō gofukudana)	Daimaru silk merchant shops	People depicted are carpenters	1858 / 7	Nihonbashiōdenma-chō, Chūō; 35°41′26.3″N 139°46′48.9″E	
75	The Dyers' Quarter in Kanda (神田紺屋町, Kanda konya-chō)	Kanda dye works, Edo Castle, Mount Fuji	Kanji on first two white-blue fabrics reads "sakana" and is a reference to the publisher Sakanaya Eikichi, last two white-blue fabrics contain Hiroshige's monogram	1857 / 11	Kandakonya-chō, Sumida; 35°41′30″N 139°46′28″E	
76	Bamboo Quay by Kyōbashi Bridge (京橋竹がし, Kyōbashi Takegashi)	Kyōbashi River, Kyōbashi Bridge	—	1857 / 12	Kyōbashi, Chūō; 35°40′30.3″N 139°46′8.5″E	
77	Inari Bridge and the Minato Shrine in Teppōzu (鉄砲洲稲荷橋湊神社, Teppōzu Inaribashi Minato jinja)	Hatchōbori Canal, Minato Shrine, Inari Bridge, Mount Fuji	—	1857 / 2	Minato, Chūō; 35°40′25.5″N 139°46′48.5″E	
78	Teppōzu and Tsukiji Monzeki Temple (鉄砲洲築地門跡, Teppōzu Tsukiji Monzeki)	Sumida River, Tsukiji Hongan-ji Temple	Like no. 79, this print has the changed series title: Entertaining Supplements to the One Hundred Famous Views of Edo, as likely Hiroshige wanted to end this series having produced 110 plates already at the time; he resumed the original title on the publisher insisting to do so	1858 / 7	Tsukiji, Chūō; 35°40′0″N 139°46′50.5″E	
79	Shiba Shinmei Shrine and Zōjōji Temple (芝神明増上寺, Shiba Shinmei Zōjōji)	Shiba Shinmei Shrine, Zōjōji	—	1858 / 7	Shibakōen, Minato; 35°39′24.7″N 139°45′15″E	
80	Kanasugi Bridge and Shibaura (金杉橋芝浦, Kanasugibashi Shibaura)	Kanasugi Bridge	Print shows pilgrims of the Nichiren sect; brown and white cloths at bottom left contain abbreviation "Uoei" of the publisher's name Sakanaya Eikichi	1857 / 7	Hamamatsu-chō, Minato; 35°39′11″N 139°45′14.6″E	
81	Ushimachi in Takanawa (高輪うしまち, Takanawa ushimachi)	Tōkaidō, Edo Bay with daiba	Place name Takanawa meaning "high wheel" is symbolized by the wheel on the right and the rainbow	1857 / 4	Takanawa, Minato; 35°38′17.7″N 139°44′23″E	
82	Moon Viewing (月の岬, Tsuki no Misaki)	Edo Bay	Approximately same view as no. 83	1857 / 8	Mita, Minato; 35°37′19″N 139°44′25.5″E	
83	Shinagawa Susaki (品川すさき)	Meguro River, Benten Shrine, Edo Bay with daiba	Establishment depicted in no. 82 might be the one cropped in the bottom left of this print	1856 / 4	Higashi-shinagawa, Shinagawa; 35°37′16.6″N 139°44′32.4″E	
84	"Grandpa's Teahouse" in Meguro (目黒爺々が茶屋, Meguro jijigachaya)	Teahouse and teastall, Mount Fuji	—	1857 / 4	Mita, Meguro; 35°38′24.6″N 139°42′32.8″E	
85	Kinokuni Hill and Distant View of Akasaka and the Tameike Pond (紀ノ国坂赤坂溜池遠景, Kinokunizaka Akasaka Tameike enkei)	outer Benkeibori moat of Edo Castle	People depicted are samurai	1857 / 9	Akasaka, Minato; 35°40′46.5″N 139°43′57″E	
86	Naitō Shinjuku in Yotsuya (四ッ谷内藤新宿, Yotsuya Naitō Shinjuku)	Naitō Shinjuku (first station of the Kōshū Kaidō)	Depiction of horse dung was criticized for being vulgar; Hiroshige likely alludes to the quote: "flowers thriving on the horse dung of Yotsuya" from the 1775 book Master Flashgold's Splendiferous Dream referring to the prostitutes of Shinjuku	1857 / 11	Shinjuku, Shinjuku; 35°41′23.3″N 139°42′25.5″E	
87	Benten Shrine at the Inokashira Pond (井の頭の池弁天の社, Inokashira no ike Benten no yashiro)	Benten Shrine, Inokashira Pond	Depicts most western point of the series and location furthest away from central Edo	1856 / 4	Inokashira Park, Musashino; 35°41′58.3″N 139°34′29.1″E	
88	Takinogawa in Ōji (王子滝の川, Ōji Takinogawa)	Takinogawa, Matsubashi Benten Shrine, Kongo-ji Temple	Original orange color of autumn color has turned brownish-black due to oxidation over time	1856 / 4	Ōji, Kita; 35°45′7.2″N 139°43′47.8″E	
89	"Moon Pine" in Ueno (上野山内月のまつ, Ueno sannai Tsuki no matsu)	Moon Pine, Shinobazu Pond, Benten Shrine	—	1857 / 8	Ueno, Taitō; 35°42′44.9″N 139°46′23.1″E	
90	Night View of Saruwaka-machi (猿わか町よるの景, Saruwaka-machi yoru no kei)	Saruwaka-chō street with theatres	Notable for the use of peoples' shadows giving the impression of puppets on a stage; the street was home to the Kabuki and marionette theatres	1856 / 9	Asakusa, Taitō; 35°43′3″N 139°48′3.4″E	
91	In the Akiba Shrine at Ukeji (請地秋葉の境内, Ukechi Akiba no keinai)	Garden of Akiba Shrine	People depicted in the bottom left might be Hiroshige as a monk with painting utensils, (Note: Hiroshige had become a monk in 1856.) his wife Yasu and their adopted daughter Tatsu according to Henry D. Smith	1857 / 8	Mukōjima, Sumida; 35°43′1″N 139°48′46.3″E	
92	Mokuboji Temple and Vegetable Fields on Uchigawa Inlet (木母寺内川御前栽畑, Mokubōji Uchigawa Gozensaibata)	Uchigawa inlet of Sumida River, Uekiya Han'emon restaurant	The Mokuboji temple mentioned in the title is close but not depicted in this print; Tokugawa Iesada had visited the restaurant one month before publication of the print	1857 / 12	Tsutsumidōri, Sumida; 35°44′2.2″N 139°48′51.3″E	
93	Niijuku Ferry (にい宿のわたし, Niijuku no watashi)	Nakagawa River	Northeasternmost scene of the series confirmed by detailed depiction of the Edo side of the river and vagueness on the opposite bank	1857 / 2	Niijuku, Katsushika; 35°45′47.4″N 139°51′15.5″E	
94	The Maple Trees at Mama, the Tekona Shrine and Tsugihashi Bridge (真間の紅葉手古那の社継はし, Mama no momiji Tekona no yashiro Tsugihashi)	Edogawa River, Tekona Shrine, Tsugihashi Bridge	Original orange color of autumn color has turned brownish-black due to oxidation over time	1857 / 1	Mama, Ichikawa, Chiba Prefecture; 35°44′18″N 139°54′33.2″E	
95	View of Kōnodai and the Tone River (鴻の台とね川風景, Kōnodai Tonegawa Fūkei)	Tone River (today Edogawa), Mount Fuji	—	1856 / 5	Kōnodai, Ichikawa, Chiba Prefecture; 35°44′52″N 139°53′51″E	
96	Horie and Nekozane (堀江ねこざね, Horie Nekozane)	branch of the Edogawa River, Horie and Nekozane villages, Edo Bay, Mount Fuji	One of the first five prints sanctioned by the censors	1856 / 2	Nekozane, Urayasu, Chiba Prefecture; 35°39′33″N 139°53′49″E	
97	"Five Pines" and the Onagi Canal (小奈木川五本まつ, Ongagigawa Gohonmatsu)	Onagi Canal	Tree depicted is the only surviving of five pines and was at the time of Hiroshige known as "Five Pines"; Onagi Canal was in fact straight	1856 / 7	Kōtō; 35°41′6.5″N 139°49′5″E	
98	Fireworks by Ryōgoku Bridge (両国花火, Ryōgoku hanabi)	Sumida River, Ryōgoku Bridge	—	1858 / 8	Ryōgoku, Sumida; 35°41′36.8″N 139°47′19.5″E	
99	Kinryūzan Temple in Asakusa (浅草金龍山, Asakusa Kinryūzan)	Kaminarimon, Hōzōmon and pagoda of Sensō-ji	Thought to commemorate the restoration of the pagoda two month prior to the publication of the print after damage suffered in the 1855 earthquake	1856 / 7	Asakusa, Taitō; 35°42′40″N 139°47′47″E	
100	Nihon Embankment and Yoshiwara (よし原日本堤, Yoshiwara Nihondzutsumi)	Nihon Embankment, Yoshiwara	—	1857 / 4	Asakusa, Taitō; 35°43′28.5″N 139°47′50.2″E	
101	Asakusa Ricefields and Torinomachi Festival (浅草田甫酉の町詣, Asakusa tanbo Torinomachi mōde)	Yoshiwara teahouse, Chōkoku-ji temple (Ōtori Shrine), Mount Fuji	White cat represents courtesan who just finished her work; the festival of the rooster is hinted at by bear's paw hairpins resembling the good luck rakes carried by pilgrims in the background	1857 / 11	Asakusa, Taitō; 35°43′21″N 139°47′31″E	
102	Minowa, Kanasugi and Mikawashima (蓑輪金杉三河しま, Minowa Kanasugi Mikawashima)	Minowa, Kanasugi and Mikawashima villages	—	1857 / i5	Asakusa, Taitō; 35°43′55″N 139°46′46″E	
103	Senju Great Bridge (千住の大はし, Senju no ōhashi)	Arakawa River, Senju Great Bridge	One of the first five prints sanctioned by the censors	1856 / 2	Senjuhashido-machi, Adachi / Minamisenju, Arakawa; 35°44′22″N 139°47′51″E	
104	Koume Embankment (小梅堤, Koumetsutsumi)	Yotsugi dōri Canal (see no. 33)	—	1857 / 2	Oshiage, Sumida; 35°42′38.3″N 139°48′30″E	
105	Oumayagashi (御厩河岸)	Sumida River	The two women are yotaka (night hawks), the lowest class of prostitutes whose faces were often disfigured forcing them to apply very thick make-up	1857 / 12	Kuramae, Taitō; 35°42′13.2″N 139°47′37.7″E	
106	The Fukagawa Lumberyards (深川木場, Fukagawa kiba)	Fukagawa Lumberyards	Character for "sakana" on the umbrella refers to Sakanaya Eikichi, the publisher of the series	1856 / 8	Kiba, Kōtō; 35°40′35″N 139°48′30″E	
107	Fukagawa Susaki and Jūmantsubo (深川州崎十万坪, Fukagawa Susaki Jūmantsubo)	Mount Tsukuba	—	1857 / i5	Tōyō, Kōtō; 35°39′58″N 139°48′32.5″E	
108	View of Shiba Coast (芝うらの風景, Shibaura no fūkei)	Hamarikyu Gardens, daiba, Edo Bay	One of the first five prints sanctioned by the censors	1856 / 2	Shibaura, Minato; 35°39′32″N 139°46′7″E	
109	Minami Shinagawa and Samezu Coast (南品川鮫洲海岸, Minamishinagawa Samezu kaigan)	Edo Bay, Kaian-ji temple, Mount Tsukuba	Fishermen gather seaweed from submerged tree trunks	1857 / 2	Higashi-Ōi, Shinagawa; 35°36′23″N 139°44′43″E	
110	"Robe-Hanging Pine" at Senzoku no ike (千束の池袈裟懸松, Senzoku no ike Kesakakematsu)	Senzoku no ike, "Robe-Hanging Pine", Hachiman Shrine	One of the first five prints sanctioned by the censors; Nichiren is said to have hung his monk's robe on this pine while resting	1856 / 2	Minami-Senzoku, Ōta; 35°36′4.5″N 139°41′30″E	
111	Meguro Drum Bridge and Sunset Hill (目黒太鼓橋夕日の岡, Meguro taikobashi Yūhi no oka)	Drum Bridge, Meguro River	Publication date of this and three other prints (no. 24, 25, 84) depicting Meguro coincides with the exhibition of a Fudō Myōō icon	1857 / 4	Shimomeguro, Meguro; 35°37′56.2″N 139°42′44″E	
112	Atagoshita and Yabu Lane (愛宕下薮小路, Atagoshita Yabukōji)	Yabu Lane, residences of the daimyōs Katō from Minakuchi and Hijikata from Komono, gate of Atago Shrine	Yabu Lane is to the far right beyond the bamboo thicket lining it	1857 / 12	Nishi-Shinbashi / Toranomon, Minato; 35°40′5″N 139°45′2.6″E	
113	Aoi Slope outside Toranomon gate (虎の門外あふひ坂, Toranomon soto Aoizaka)	Aoi Slope, moat	—	1857 / 11	Toranomon, Minato; 35°40′10.6″N 139°44′51.7″E	
114	Bikuni Bridge in Snow (びくにはし雪中, Bikunihashi setchū)	Bikuni Bridge, outer moat of Edo Castle	Believed to be created by Hiroshige II based on empty foreground, depiction of wall and schematic arrangement of snowflakes. Sign on left advertises "mountain whale" meat, referring to wild boar.	1858 / 10	Ginza, Chūō; 35°40′33.3″N 139°45′59.2″E	
115	The Takata Riding Grounds (高田の馬場, Takada no baba)	Takata Riding Grounds	—	1857 / 2	Waseda-machi, Shinjuku; 35°42′36″N 139°42′54″E	
116	Sugatami Bridge, Omokage Bridge and Jariba at Takata (高田姿見のはし俤の橋砂利場, Takata Sugatami no hashi Omokage no hashi Jariba)	Kanda River, Omokage Bridge, Hikawa rice field, Hikawa Shrine, Sugatami Bridge	Notable for striking colors; Tokugawa Iesada crossed the Omokage Bridge in the publication month	1857 / 1	Takada, Toshima; 35°42′47.7″N 139°42′51.3″E	
117	View from the Hilltop of Yushima Tenjin Shrine (湯しま天神坂上眺望, Yushima Tenjin sakaue chōbō)	Yushima Tenjin Shrine, Shinobazu Pond, Kan'ei-ji	—	1856 / 4	Yushima, Bunkyō; 35°42′27″N 139°46′6.2″E	
118	Kitsunebi on New Year's Night under the Enoki Tree near Ōji (王子装束ゑの木大晦日の狐火, Ōji shōzoku wenoki ōtsugomorihi no kitsunebi)	Enoki tree	—	1857 / 9	Ōji, Kita; 35°45′23.1″N 139°44′16.3″E	
119	View of the Paulownia Imperiales Trees at Akasaka on a Rainy Evening (赤坂桐畑雨中夕けい, Akasaka kiribatake uchū yūkei)	Tameike Pond	Work by Hiroshige II; not always included in collections of One Hundred Famous Views of Edo; variously thought to be replacement print for no. 52, The Paulownia Garden at Akasaka, although its woodblock prints show significant wear indicating age. Alternatively a work on commission by Sakanaya Eikichi, celebrating Hiroshige II's adoption of his name and Hiroshige's seal	1859 / 4	Akasaka, Minato; 35°40′39.4″N 139°44′10.5″E	
