= Sudden Shower over Shin-Ōhashi Bridge and Atake =

1857 woodblock print by Hiroshige

Sudden Shower over Shin-Ōhashi bridge and Atake
- 大はしあたけの夕立 (Japanese)
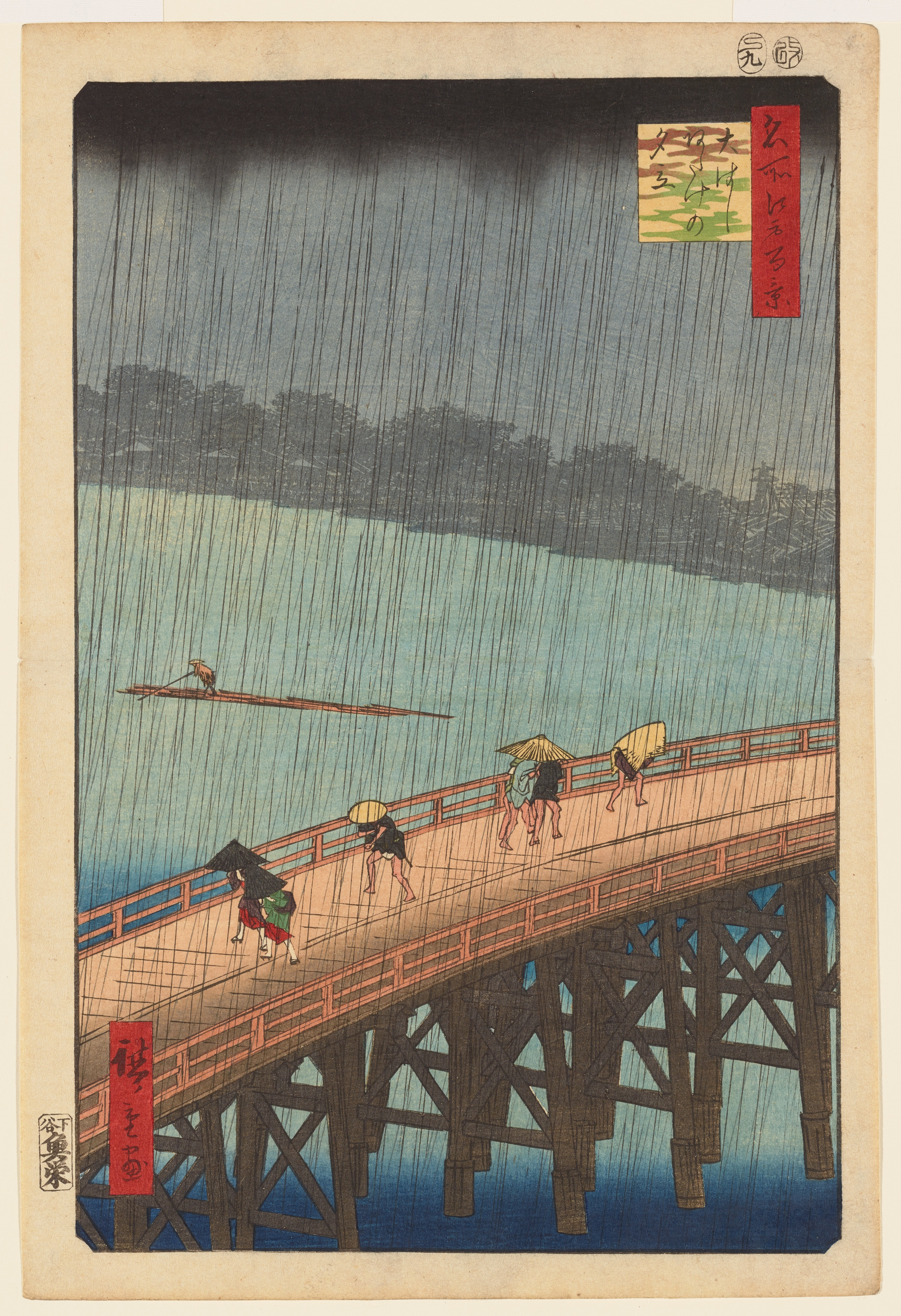
- Artist: Andō Hiroshige
- Year: 9th month of 1857
- Catalogue: Number 52 or 58 in the series One Hundred Famous Views of Edo
- Type: Woodblock print
- Dimensions: Approx 37 x 25 cm (prints vary)
- Location: Edo (modern Tokyo); 35°41′7″N 139°47′35″E

Sudden Shower over Shin-Ōhashi bridge and Atake (大はしあたけの夕立, Ōhashi atake no yūdachi) is a woodblock print in the ukiyo-e genre by the Japanese artist Hiroshige. It was published in 1857 as part of the series One Hundred Famous Views of Edo and is one of his best known prints.

== One Hundred Famous Views of Edo ==
The picture is part of the series One Hundred Famous Views of Edo which actually features 119 views of 'named places' or 'celebrated spots' in the area that is today Tokyo. The series was unique in being the first to feature this many separate landscape views. The series was produced between 1856 and 1859 with Hiroshige II finishing the series after the death of Hiroshige in 1858. This print was published in the ninth month of 1857. The series was commissioned shortly after the 1855 Edo earthquake and subsequent fires and featured many of the newly rebuilt or repaired buildings. The prints may have commemorated or helped draw Edo's citizens attention to the progress of the rebuilding.

== Description ==
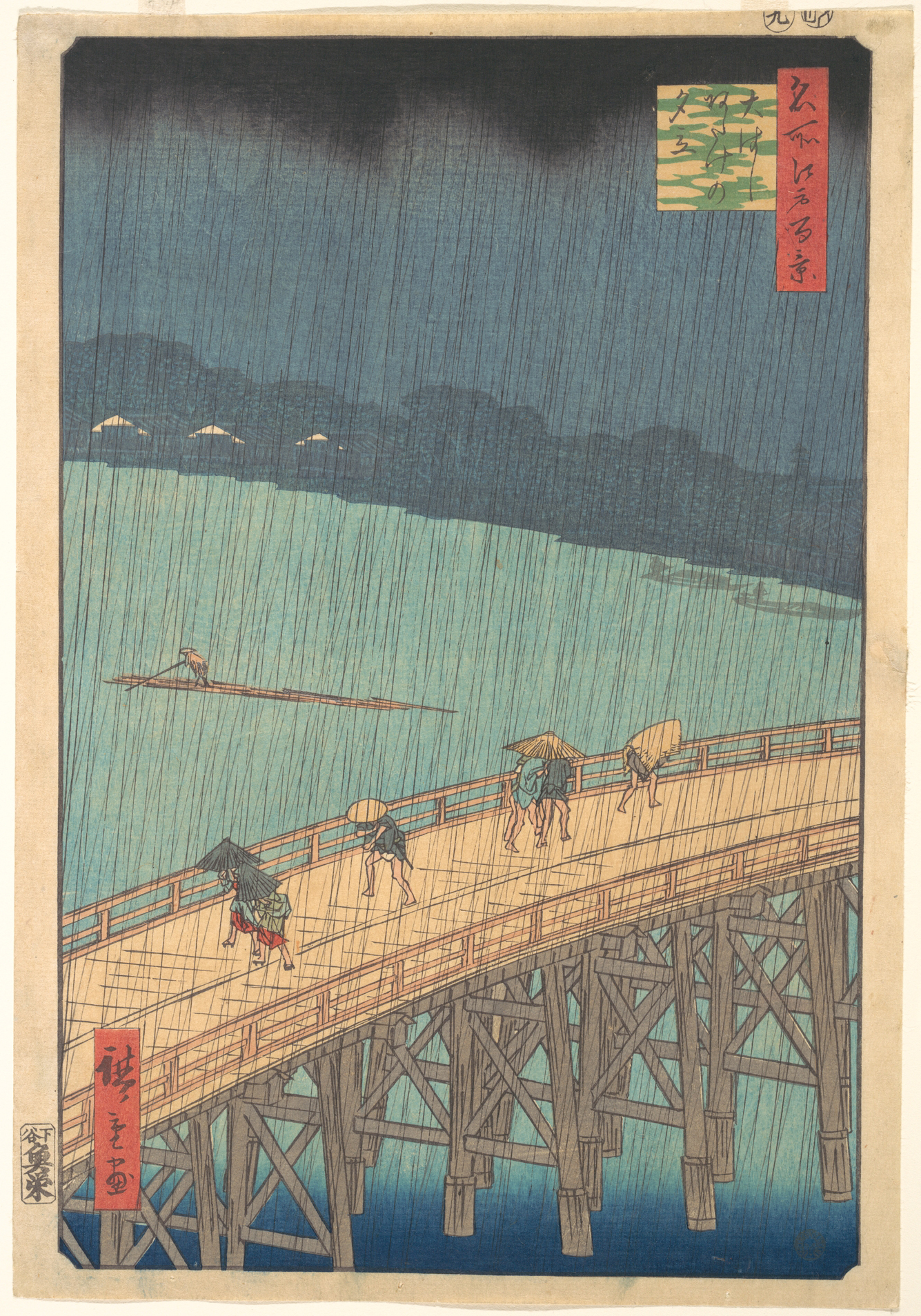
Original printing

The print shows a small part of the wooden Shin-Ōhashi (New Great) bridge over the Sumida River. A boatman punts his log raft towards the Fukagawa timber yards, and in the background, at the far bank of the river, is a part of Edo known as Atake after the government ship, the Atakemaru (ja:安宅丸) that was moored there. Two women and four or five men are shown crossing the bridge sheltering under hats, umbrellas or straw capes from a sudden shower of rain. Sudden showers are a recurring theme in ukiyo-e works and here, in what Hiroshige calls "white rain", the downpour is depicted using a large number of thin dark parallel lines in 2 directions - a difficult skill in woodblock carving. The dark clouds are produced using a gradated bokashi technique and vary significantly between prints. The rain, sheltering people and log raft at the centre of the image give the image a sense of movement.

=== Print variations ===
The original printing differs considerably from the second version and later reprints. The earliest version has two boats on the far side of the river which are no longer present in later editions, possibly because a grey background block was recut and the boats were forgotten in the process. A mistake made in cutting of the woodblock, where a piece of the bridge piles was accidentally cut away leaving a blank space, was corrected in subsequent prints. Trees in the background are later given more definition while the three houses almost disappear. The title cartouche (top right) was reprinted in three rather than two colours in later prints, which also feature a deep blue bokashi (gradation) applied to the left of the bridge and underneath the piles to the right, and a shadow on the walkway.

== Influence ==
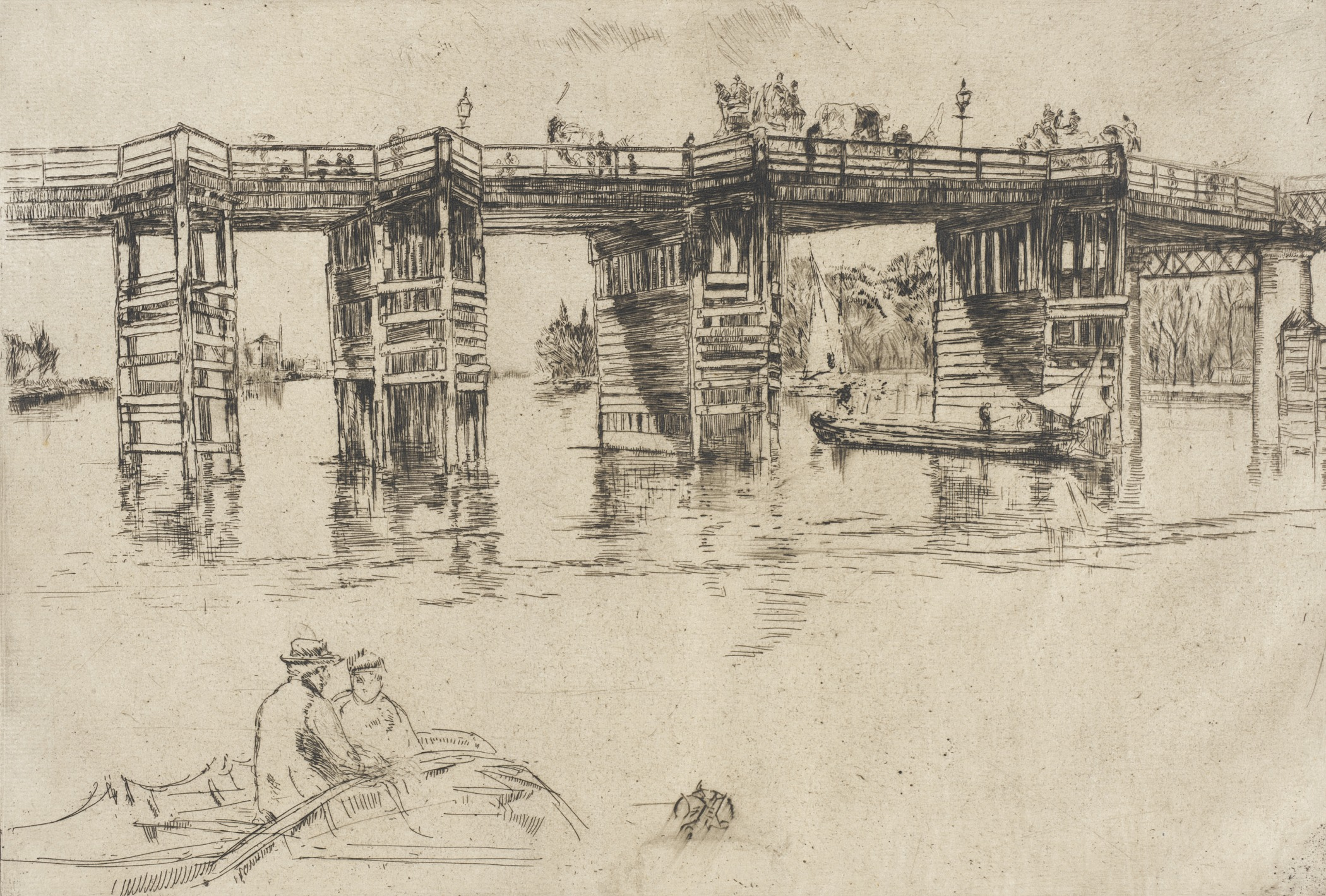
'Old Putney Bridge' etching by Whistler from the 1870s

Some of Hiroshige's most popular prints were produced in the tens of thousands at a low individual cost and due to the opening up of Japan after 1853 were popular both in Japan and Europe where they had a huge influence on the future Impressionist artists. Whistler produced a number of prints and paintings using a bridge motif in London in the 1870s that were heavily influenced in their composition and subject by Hiroshige's many bridge prints. He used for example non-Western composition in the siting of the bridges, sometimes using no detailed foreground or background objects, scurrying undetailed people on the bridges, large area of negative space and the odd boat on the river. The theme of scurrying people sheltering from the weather under umbrellas that is typical of One Hundred Views of Edo was an influence on Félix Buhot's Le Petit Enterrement and Hiroshige's high horizons, areas of blue wash and strong foreground imagery with lack of middle ground influenced Auguste-Louis Lepère's prints such as La Convalescente: Madame Lepère.

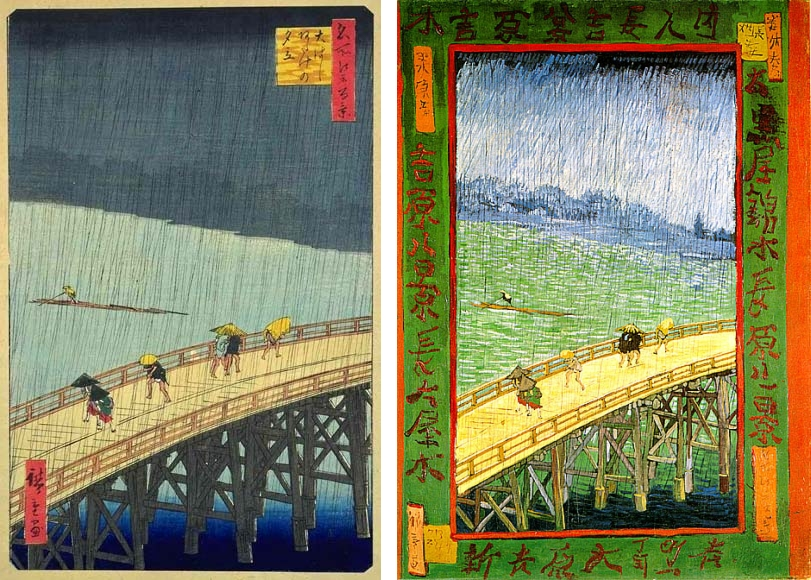
Hiroshige's original woodblock print and Van Gogh's copy in oil

Vincent van Gogh was a major collector of Japanese prints, decorating his studio with them. He was heavily influenced by these prints, particularly Hiroshige, and made copies of two from the One Hundred Famous Views of Edo, Plum Park in Kameido and this one. Van Gogh had first encountered the image in 1886 on the cover of an issue of the magazine Paris Illustré, prepared by the Japanese art dealer Hayashi Tadamasa. He made these copies in order to try out for himself elements he admired such as the cropped composition, blocks of colour with strong outlines and diagonal elements. Van Gogh's painting used brighter colours with greater contrast than the original, conspicuous brushstrokes rather than areas of flat colour, and was also framed with a selection of Van Gogh's approximations to Japanese characters.

Hiroshige's print was listed by The Observer's art critic Laura Cumming as one of the 10 best skies in art.

The composer Geoffrey Poole produced the work Crossing Ohashi Bridge for the Goldberg Ensemble and named after Hiroshige's print.
