= Plum Park in Kameido =

1857 woodblock print by Hiroshige

Plum Garden at Kameido
- 亀戸梅屋舗, Kameido Umeyashiki (Japanese)
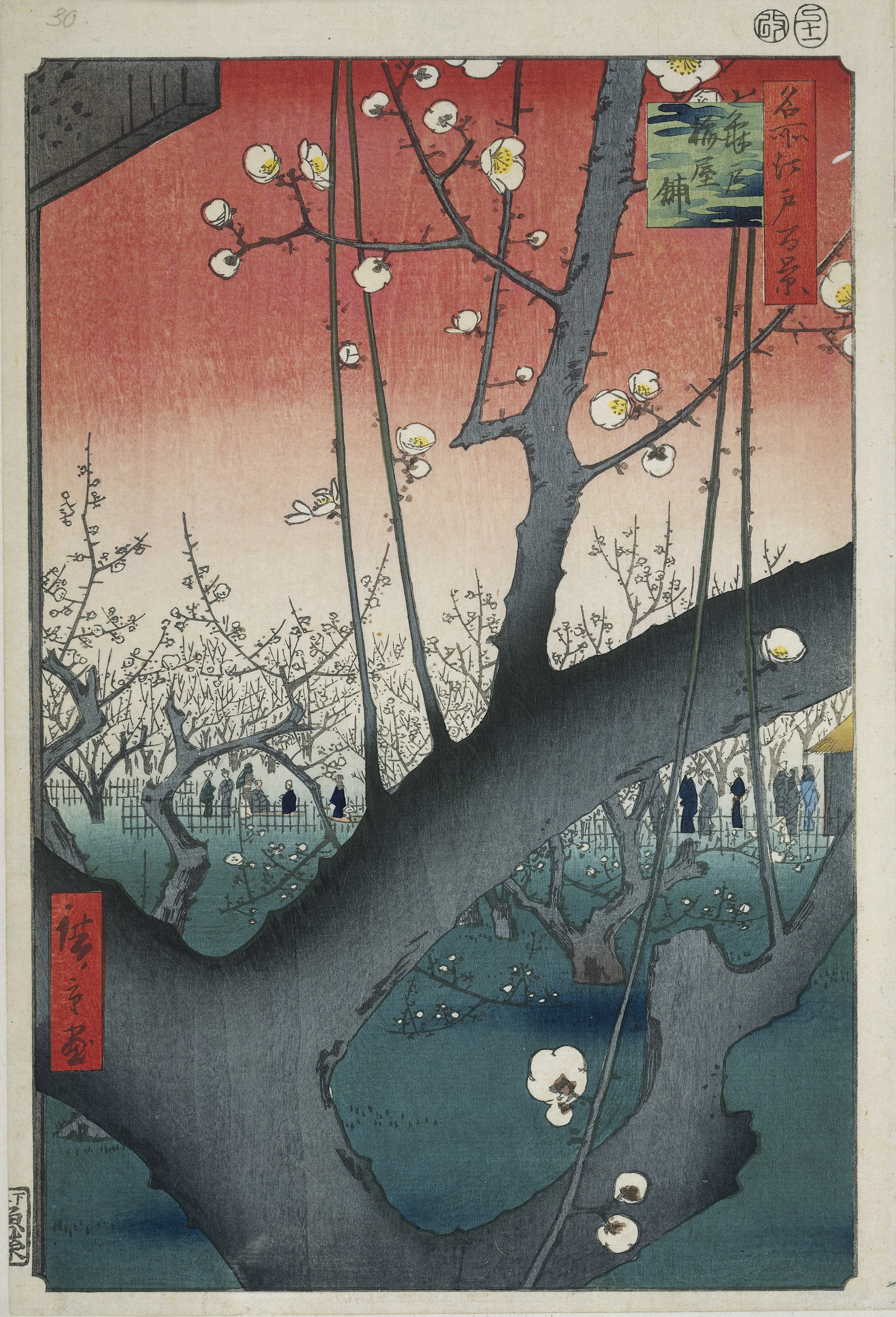
- Artist: Andō Hiroshige
- Year: 11th month of 1857
- Catalogue: number 30 in the series One Hundred Famous Views of Edo
- Type: woodblock print
- Dimensions: about 37 x 25 cm (prints vary)
- Location: Kameido, Kōtō City, Edo / Tokyo; 35°42′16.3″N 139°49′26.1″E

Plum Park in Kameido (亀戸梅屋舗, Kameido Umeyashiki) is a woodblock print in the ukiyo-e genre by the Japanese artist Hiroshige. It was published in 1857 as the thirtieth print in the One Hundred Famous Views of Edo series and depicts Prunus mume trees in bloom.

Vincent van Gogh, who was influenced by Japanese prints, reproduced the image in his 1887 painting Flowering Plum Tree (after Hiroshige).

== One Hundred Famous Views of Edo ==
Printmaking process of "Plum Park in Kameido". Displayed at the Edo-Tokyo Museum.

The picture is part of the series One Hundred Famous Views of Edo which actually features 119 views of named places or celebrated spots in the city of Edo (modern Tokyo). The series was the first to feature this many separate landscape views.

The series was produced between 1856 and 1859, with Hiroshige II finishing the series after the death of Hiroshige in 1858. This print is the 30th in the series, within its spring section, and was published in the eleventh month of 1857. The series was commissioned shortly after the 1855 Edo earthquake and subsequent fires, and featured many of the newly rebuilt or repaired buildings. The prints may have commemorated or helped draw the attention of Edo's citizens to the progress of the rebuilding. The series is in portrait orientation, which was a break from ukiyo-e tradition for landscape prints, and proved popular with his audience.

== Description ==
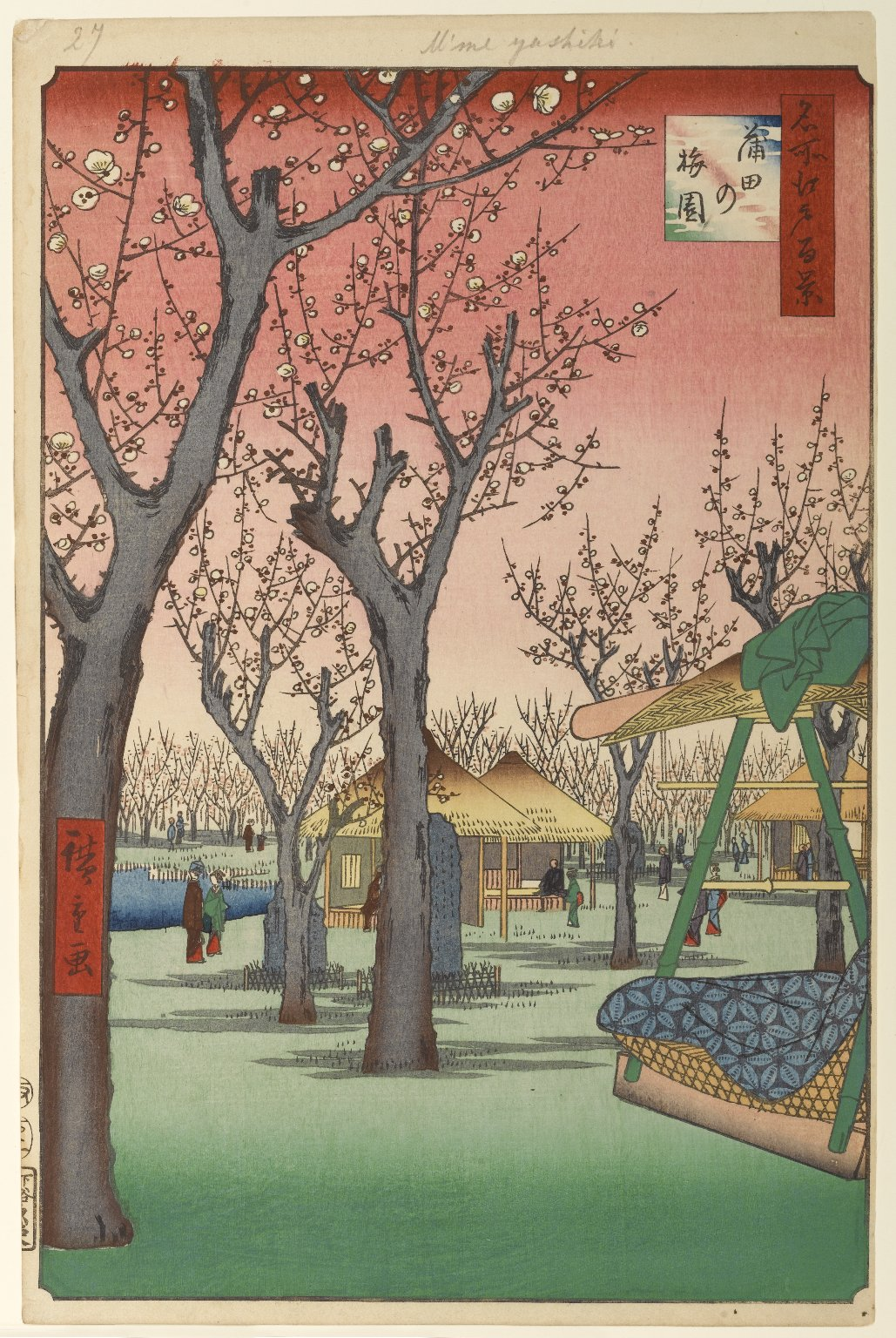
Number 27 in One Hundred Famous Views of Edo, Plum Orchard in Kamada (蒲田の梅園 Kamada no umezono, shows a similar colour scheme and subject.

The print shows part of the most famous tree in Edo, the "Sleeping Dragon Plum" (臥竜梅, garyūbai), which had blossoms "so white when full in bloom as to drive off the darkness" and branches that travelled looping across the ground like a dragon to emerge as further trunks over an area of 50 square feet. The tree is shown with a unique abstract composition, with wide branches taking up much of the foreground but cropped by the frame of the picture giving a resemblance to Japanese calligraphy. The tree is situated in Umeyashiki, a plum garden by the banks of the Sumida River in Kameido. Visible between the branches of the Sleeping Dragon Plum are further trees and small figures behind a low fence contemplating the plum blossom. A sign, possibly forbidding vandalism, is in the foreground at the top left of the image. The image demonstrates Hiroshige's mastery of Japanese landscapes and uses his exaggerated single-point perspective whereby the closest objects in view are increased in size. The positioning of the undetailed subject 'too close to the lens' is intended to draw the eye to the scene beyond. In addition the use of the unnatural red sky has the effect of flattening the visible space.

== Influence ==
Hiroshige's most popular prints were produced in the tens of thousands at a low individual cost and due to the opening up of Japan after 1853 were popular both in Japan and Europe where they had a huge influence on the Impressionist artists. Hiroshige's own former pupil, Hiroshige II, paid tribute to the composition in April 1862, reproducing it for his own series Tōto Sanjūrokkei (Thirty-six Views of the Eastern Capital).

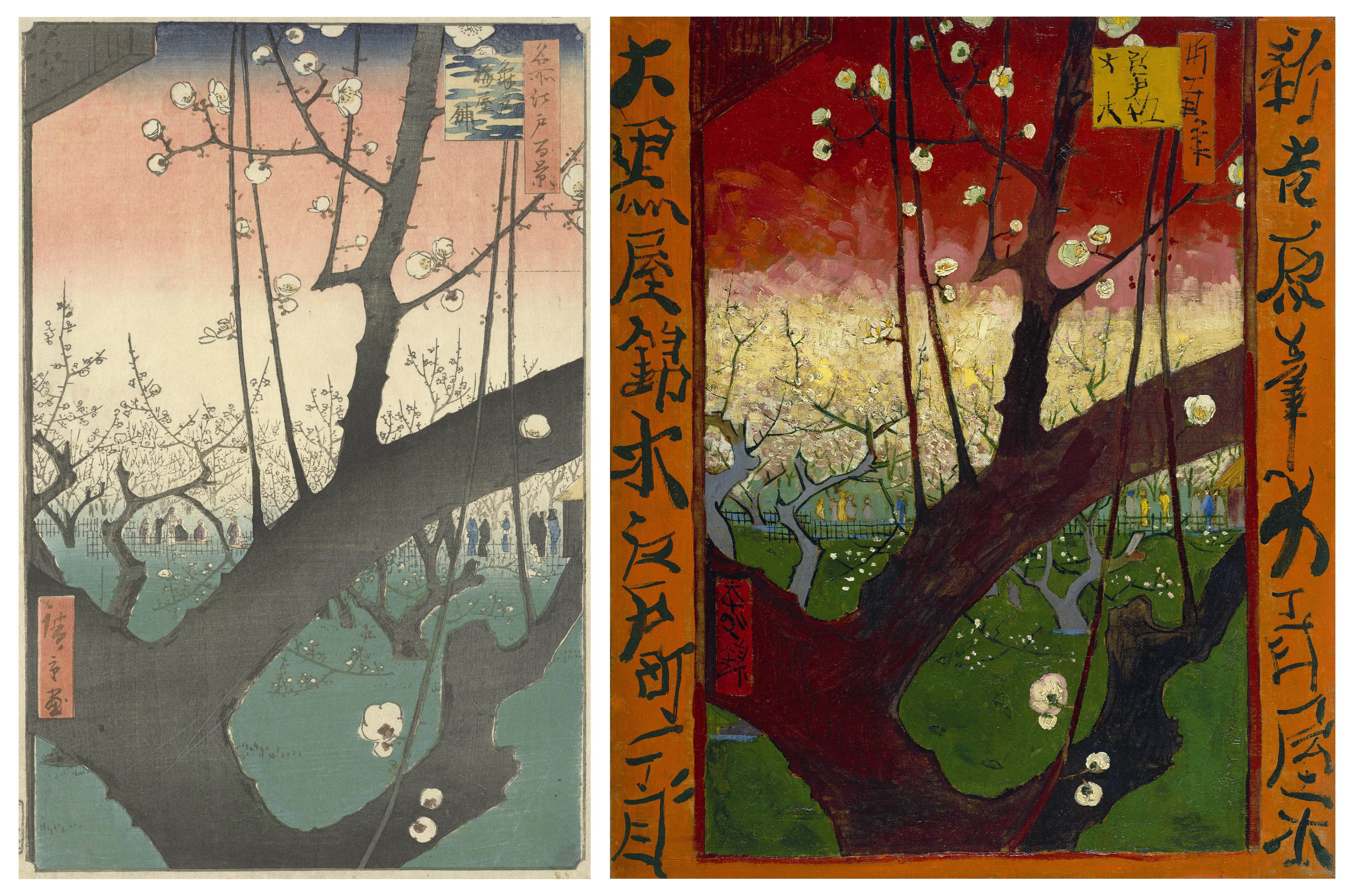
Hiroshige's original woodblock print and Van Gogh's copy in oil

Vincent van Gogh was a collector of Japanese prints, decorating his studio with them. He was heavily influenced by these prints, particularly those by Hiroshige, and in 1887 painted copies of two of the One Hundred Famous Views of Edo, Sudden Shower over Shin-Ōhashi bridge and Atake and Plum Park. He made these copies in order to try out for himself elements he admired such as the cropped composition, decorative use of colour, large blocks of colour with strong outlines, flat brushstrokes, and diagonal elements. Van Gogh ignored the shading present in the trunk and background of Hiroshige's image, which there implied age, and instead used colours with more "passion" and "youthfulness".
