= Japonaiserie (Van Gogh) =

Influence of Japanese art on the works of Vincent van Gogh

The Courtesan (after Eisen)
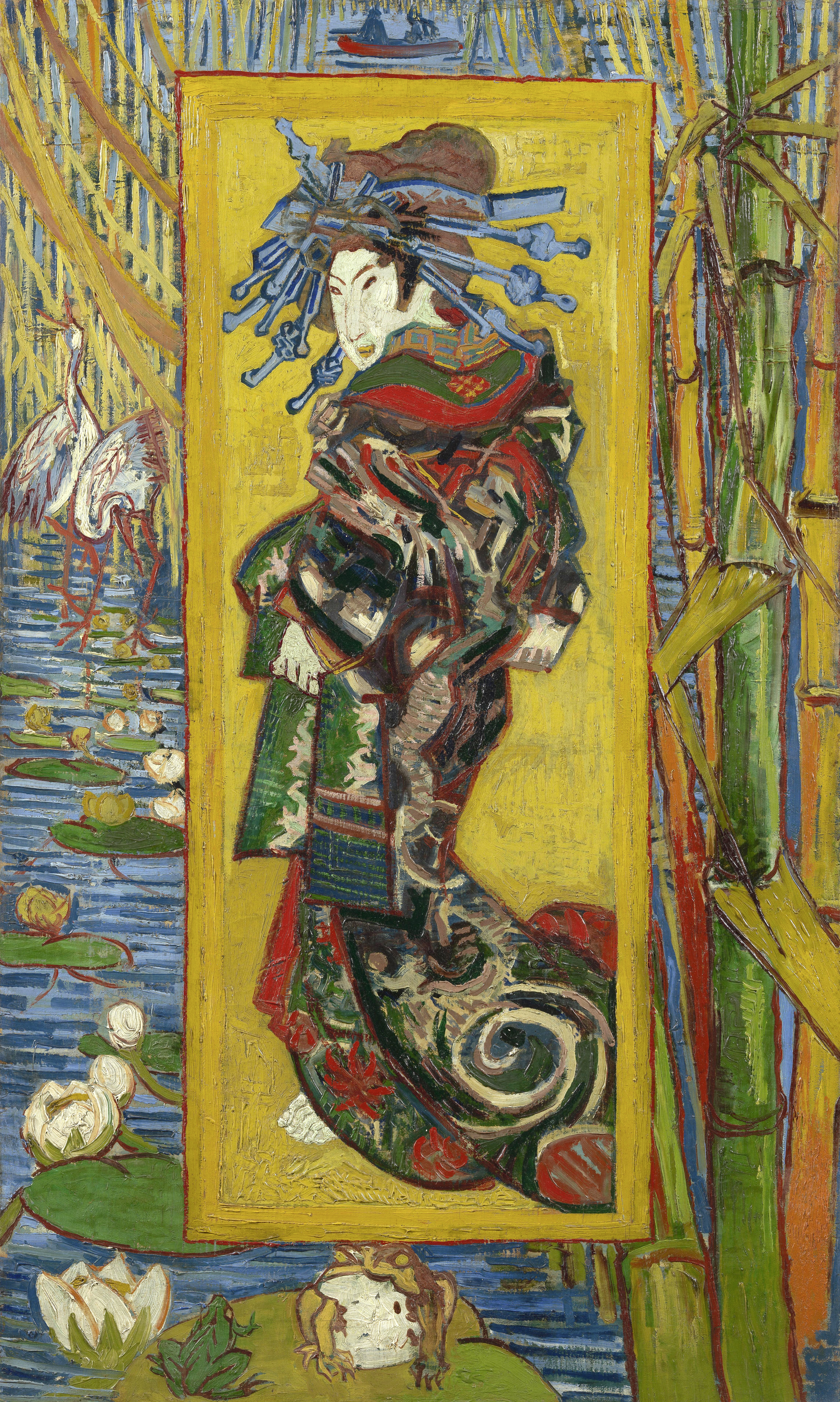
- Artist: Vincent van Gogh
- Year: 1887
- Catalogue: F373; JH1298
- Medium: Oil on canvas
- Dimensions: 105.5 cm × 60.5 cm (41½ in × 23¾ in)
- Location: Van Gogh Museum; Amsterdam

Japonaiserie (English: Japanesery) was the term used by Dutch Post-Impressionist painter Vincent van Gogh to express the influence of Japanese art on his works.

== Background ==
Before 1854, trade with Japan was limited to a Dutch monopoly, and Japanese goods imported into Europe primarily comprised porcelain and lacquer ware. The Convention of Kanagawa ended the 200-year Japanese foreign policy of Seclusion and opened up trade between Japan and the West. From the 1860s, ukiyo-e, Japanese woodblock prints, became a source of inspiration for many Western artists.

== Influence of Japanese art on van Gogh ==
Curator Leo Jansen of the Van Gogh Museum explains Japonaiserie

Van Gogh's interest in Japanese prints began when he discovered illustrations by Félix Régamey featured in The Illustrated London News and Le Monde Illustré. Régamey created woodblock prints, followed Japanese techniques, and often depicted scenes of Japanese life. Beginning in 1885, Van Gogh switched from collecting magazine illustrations, such as Régamey, to collecting ukiyo-e prints which could be bought in small Parisian shops. Van Gogh bought Japanese ukiyo-e woodcuts in the docklands of Antwerp, later incorporating elements of their style into the background of some of his paintings. Vincent possessed twelve prints from Hiroshige's series One Hundred Famous Views of Edo, and he also had bought Two Girls Bathing by Kunisada II, 1868. These prints were influential to his artistic development.

He shared his collection with his contemporaries and organized a Japanese print exhibition in Paris in 1887. He and his brother Theo van Gogh dealt in these prints for some time, eventually amassing hundreds of them, which are now housed in the Van Gogh Museum in Amsterdam.

A month later he wrote,

All my work is based to some extent on Japanese art...

Van Gogh made three copies of ukiyo-e prints: The Courtesan and the two studies after Hiroshige.

Van Gogh's dealing in ukiyo-e prints brought him into contact with Siegfried Bing, who was prominent in the introduction of Japanese art to the West and later in the development of Art Nouveau. Van Gogh developed an idealised conception of the Japanese artist which led him to the Yellow House at Arles and his attempt to form a utopian art colony there with Paul Gauguin.

== Style ==
Van Gogh admired the techniques of Japanese artists.

Characteristic features of ukiyo-e prints include their ordinary subject matter, the distinctive cropping of their compositions, bold and assertive outlines, absent or unusual perspective, flat regions of uniform colour, uniform lighting, absence of chiaroscuro, and their emphasis on decorative patterns. One or more of these features can be found in numbers of Vincent's paintings from his Antwerp period onwards.

== Japonaiserie and Impressionism ==
In a letter to Theo dated 5 June 1888, Vincent remarked,

About staying in the south, even if it’s more expensive—Look, we love Japanese painting, we’ve experienced its influence—all the Impressionists have that in common—[so why not go to Japan], in other words, to what is the equivalent of Japan, the south? So I believe that the future of the new art still lies in the south after all.

In a letter of July 1888 he referred to the Impressionists as the "French Japanese".

== The Courtesan (after Eisen) ==
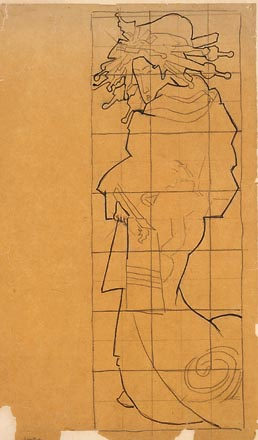
Vincent's tracing of the courtesan figure

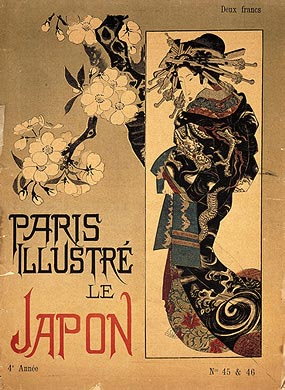
Title page of Paris Illustré Le Japon vol. 4, May 1886, no. 45-46

The May 1886 edition of Paris Illustré was devoted to Japan with text by Tadamasa Hayashi who may have inspired van Gogh's utopian notion of the Japanese artist:

Just think of that; isn't it almost a new religion that these Japanese teach us, who are so simple and live in nature as if they themselves were flowers? And we wouldn't be able to study Japanese art, it seems to me, without becoming much happier and more cheerful, and it makes us return to nature, despite our education and our work in a world of convention.

The cover carried a reverse image of a colour woodblock by Keisai Eisen depicting a Japanese courtesan or Oiran. Vincent traced this and enlarged it to produce his painting.

== Copies of Hiroshige prints ==
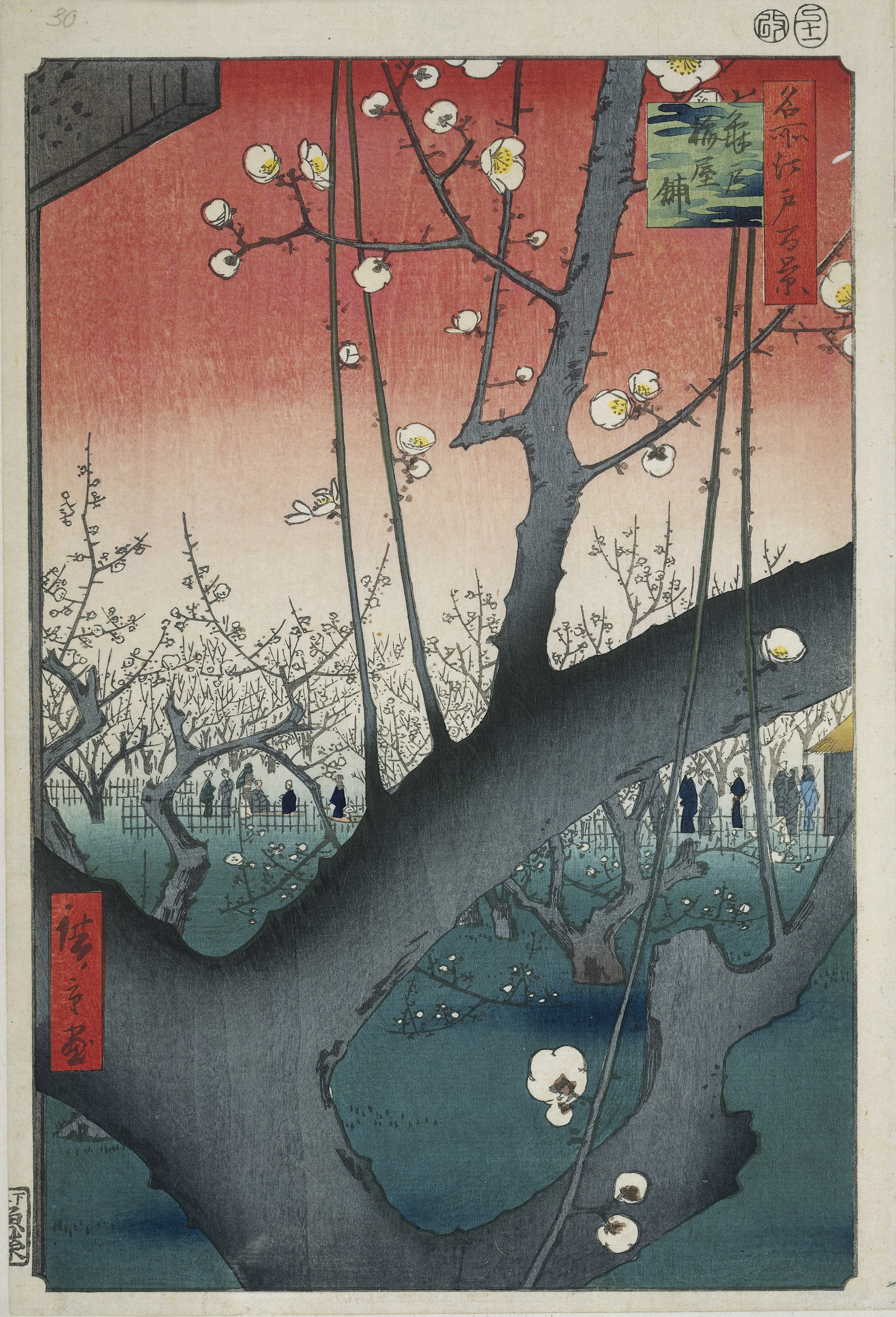
Plum Park in Kameido (1857) by Hiroshige

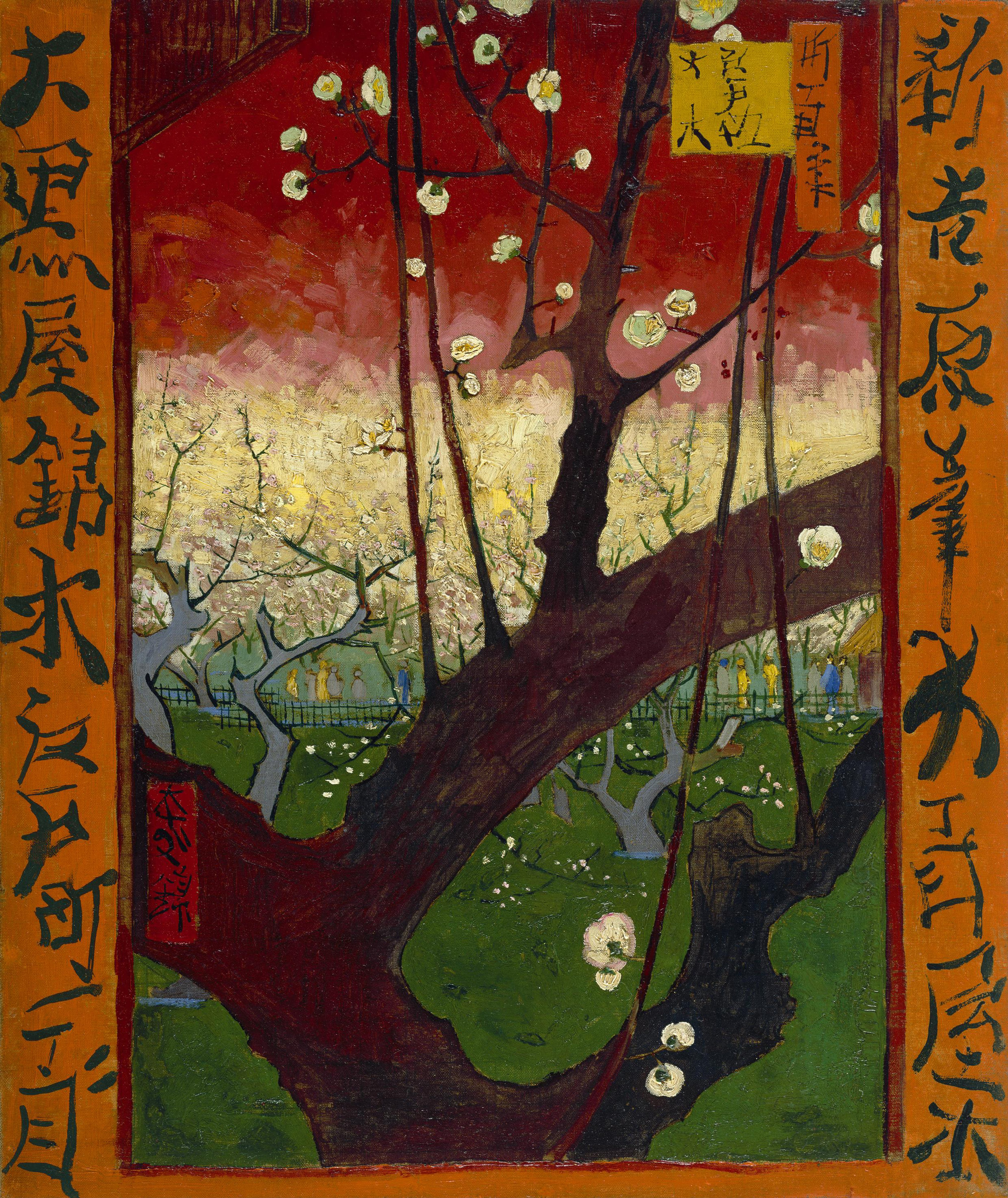
Flowering Plum Tree (after Hiroshige) (1887) by Vincent van Gogh

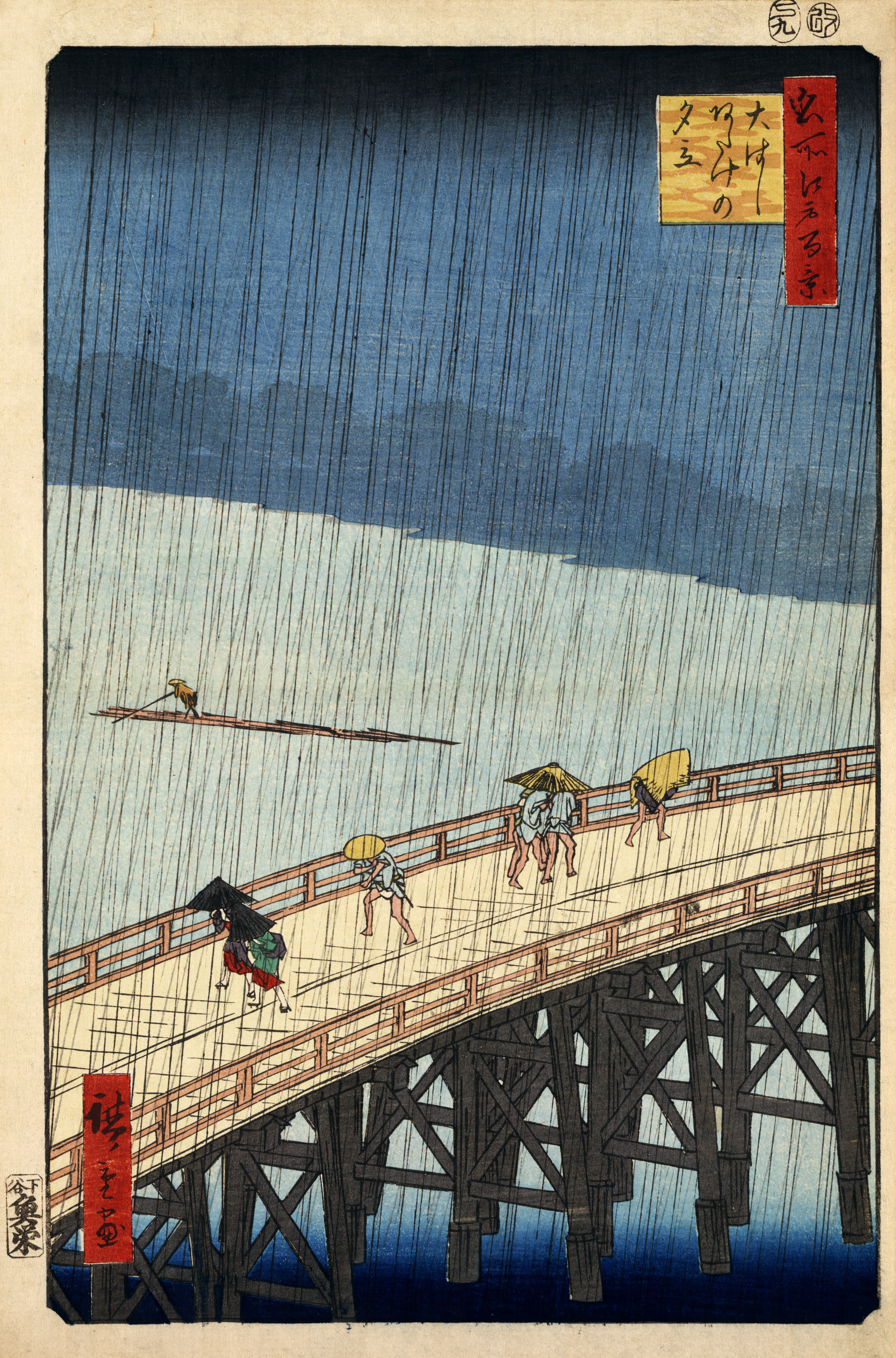
Sudden Shower over Shin-Ōhashi bridge and Atake (1857) by Hiroshige

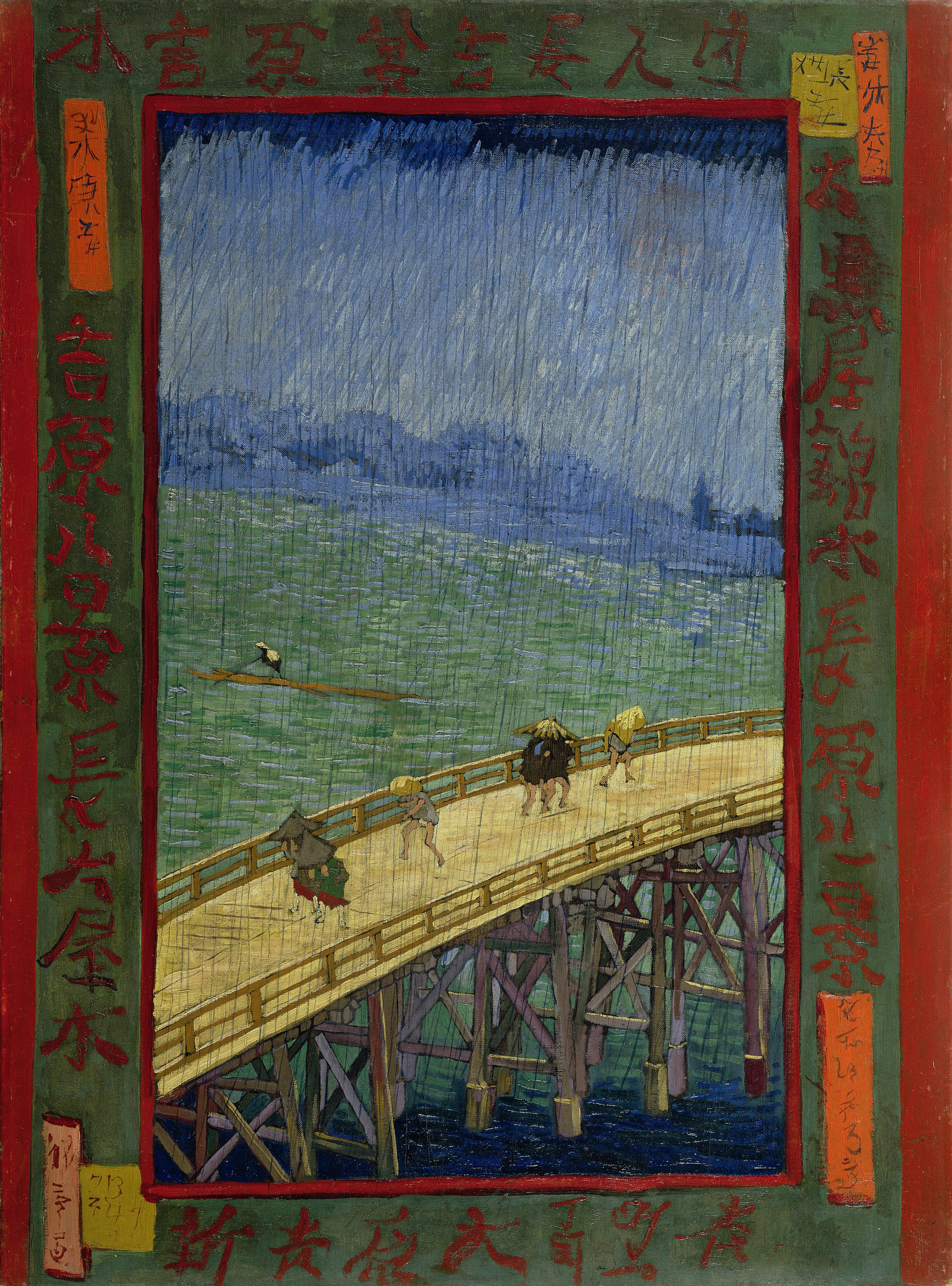
The Bridge in the Rain (after Hiroshige) (1887) by Vincent van Gogh

Van Gogh made copies of two Hiroshige prints. He altered their colours and added borders filled with calligraphic characters he borrowed from other prints.

== See also ==
- List of works by Vincent van Gogh
- Copies by Vincent van Gogh
- Japonism
