= Tadamasa Hayashi =

Japanese art dealer (1853–1906)

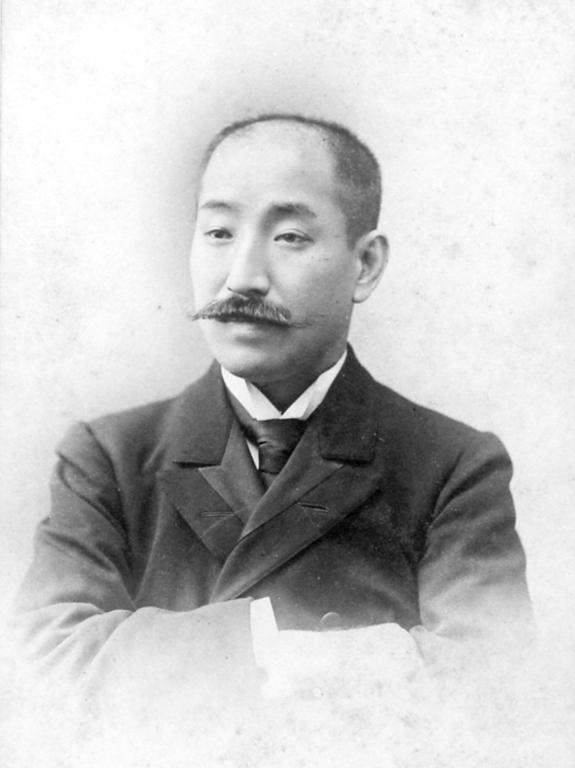
Tadamasa Hayashi

Tadamasa Hayashi (林 忠正; 1853–1906) was a Japanese art dealer who introduced traditional Japanese art such as ukiyo-e to Europe.

Tadamasa was born to the Nagasaki family of physicians. When he was still a child, he was adopted into the Hayashi family, an upper-class samurai family of Toyama-han. He then attended the University of Tokyo. In 1878, he went to Paris as a translator to seek a new life abroad. In Paris, he began a career as Japanese art dealer.

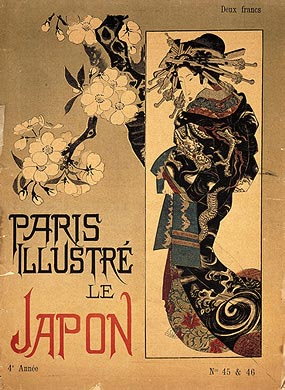
Title page of Paris Illustré "Le Japon' vol. 4, May 1886, no. 45–46

Hayashi provided the text for the May 1886 edition of Paris Illustré. Vincent van Gogh traced the figure on the title page for his painting The Courtesan. In 1900 he was a general commissioner of the Japanese art section at the World 's Fair in Paris. He also worked with Dr. George Frederick Kunz and Heber R. Bishop in writing and producing the catalog to the famous jade collection given to the Metropolitan Museum of Art in 1902.

== Literature ==
- Hayashi Tadamasa, Japonizumu to Bunka Kōryū e no Kōken. 林忠正 : ジャポニスムと文化交流. Hayashi Tadamasa: Japonisumu to bunka kōryū. Tōkyō: Buryukke, 2007.
- Koyama-Richard, Brigitte. 夢見た日本 : エドモン・ド・ゴンクールと林忠正. Yumemita Nihon: Edomon do Gonkūru to Hayashi Tadamasa. Tōkyō: Heibonsha, 2006.
- Koyama-Richard, Brigitte, Yasuko Kigi, Akiko Mabuchi, Emiko Yamanashi, and Mako Takato-Hayashi. Correspondance adressée à Hayashi Tadamasa. 2001.
- Hayashi, Tadamasa. 1981. "Catalogue d'une collection de dessins et eaux-fortes par Paul Renouard. Cette collection est destinée à être offerte par Tadamasa Hayashi à un musée de Tokio sur l'art européen. Exposition à La Boninière". Exhibitions of Draftsmen and Illustrators.
- Kawase, Hideji, and Tadamasa Hayashi. メルボルン万国博覽会報告. Meruborun Bankoku Hakurankai hōkoku. Tōkyō: Meiji Bunken Shiryō Kankōkai, 1976. OCLC Number: 39760249. Notes: Reprint of the 1882 ed., of the 1899 ed. published by Nōshōmushō Shōkōkyoku, and of the 1908 ed. published by tōkyō-fu. Description: 103, 77, [134] pages, [7] leaves of plates : illustrations; 22 cm.
- American Art Association, and Tadamasa Hayashi. Illustrated Catalogue of the Important Collection of Paintings, Water Colors, Pastels, Drawings, and Prints: Collected by the Japanese Connoisseur, the Late Tadamasa Hayashi ... to Be Sold at Unrestricted Public Sale. New York: American Art Association, 1913.
- Hayashi, Tadamasa. Catalogue of the Important Collection of Paintings, Water Colors, Pastels, Drawings and Prints, Collected by the ... Late Tadamasa Hayashi To Be Sold ... [Jan. 8-9, 1913]. New York: Amer. Art Assoc, 1913.
- Hayashi, Tadamasa. Collection of the Late Tadamasa Hayashi ... Sold ... [1913]. [New York]: [Amer. Art Assoc.], 1913.
- Hayashi, Tadamasa, and Thomas E. Kirby. Illustrated Catalogue of the Important Collection of Paintings, Water Colors, Pastels, Drawings and Prints, Collected. New York: [Lent & Graff co.], 1913.
- Hayashi, Tadamasa. [Catalogue of the collection of Tadamasa Hayashi] (Tableau à l'huile etc. ... Pastels, aquarelles, dessins. ... Estampes.). Tokyo: Tokyo Insatsu Kabushiki Kaisha, 1908.
- Bishop Collection, Heber R. Bishop, George Frederick Kunz, Stephen W. Bushell, Robert Lilley, and Tadamasa Hayashi. The Bishop Collection. Investigations and Studies in Jade. New York: Priv. Print. [The De Vinne Press], 1906.
- Hayashi, Tadamasa. Objets d'art et peintures de la Chine et du Japon. Deuxième partie, don't la vente aura lieu du lundi 16 février au samedi 21 février 1903 inclus, à l'hôtel Drouot. 1903.
- Bing, Siegfried, and Tadamasa Hayashi. Objets d'art et peintures de la Chine et du Japon deuxième partie deuxième partie. 1903.
- Hayashi, Tadamasa Bing, Samuel. Objets d'art et peintures de la Chine et du Japon. Staatsbibliothek zu Berlin - Preußischer Kulturbesitz, 1903. <http://resolver.staatsbibliothek-berlin.de/SBB0001550500020000>.
- Bing, Siegfried, and Tadamasa Hayashi. Objets d'art et peintures du Japon et de la Chine : [première partie]. 1903.
- Hayashi, Tadamasa. Catalogue d'Objets d'art et peintures de la Chine et du Japon. 1903.
- Hayashi, Tadamasa. Collection Hayashi. 1902.
- Hayashi, Tadamasa. Objects d'art du Japon et de la Chine ... don't la vente aura lieu ... 27 janvier au samedi 1er fevrier 1902 inclus dans les galeries de MM. Durand-Ruel. Paris: Chevallier, 1902.
- Hayashi, Tadamasa. Objets d'art du Japon et de la Chine, peintures, livres. 1902.
- Hayashi, Tadamasa, Paul Chevallier, and Siegfried Bing. Objets d'art et peintures de la Chine et du Japon. Paris: [s.n.], 1902.
- HAYASHI, Tadamasa. Objets d'art du Japon et de la Chine ... réunis par T. Hayashi, etc. [A sale catalogue.]. 1902.
- Hayashi, Tadamasa. Dessins, estampes, livres illustrés du Japon, réunis par T. Hayashi ...: don't la vente aura lieu du lundi 2 juin au vendredi 6 juin 1902 inclus. Paris: Hôtel Drouot, 1902.
- Bing, Siegfried, and Tadamasa Hayashi. Dessins, estampes, livres illustrés du Japon: réunis par T. Hayashi. 1902.
- Hayashi, Tadamasa. Dessins, Estampes, Livres Illustrés Du Japon. 1902.
- Hayashi, Tadamasa. Collection Hayashi: dessins, estampes, livres illustrés du Japon réunis par T. Hayashi, don't la vente aura lieu du lundi 2 juin au vendredi 6 juin 1902 inclus, à l'Hôtel Drouot. Paris: Hôtel Drouot, 1902.
- Hayashi, Tadamasa. Collection Hayashi, Objets D'art Du Japon Et De La Chine. 1902.
- Hayashi, Tadamasa. Dessins, estampes, livres illustrés du Japon. Évreux: Hérissey, 1902.
- Hayashi, Tadamasa. Collection: Objets d'art du Japon et de la Chine <don't la vente aura lieu - 1902 -dans les galeries...>. 1902.
- Hayashi, Tadamasa. Objets d'art du Japon et de la Chine: peintures, livres, réunis. Évreux: Imprimerie de C. Hérissey, 1902.
- Hayashi, Tadamasa Bing, Samuel. Objets d'art du Japon et de la Chine. Staatsbibliothek zu Berlin - Preußischer Kulturbesitz, 1902. <http://resolver.staatsbibliothek-berlin.de/SBB0001550500010000>.
- Hayashi, Tadamasa. Dessins, Estampes, Livres Illustrés Du Japon. 1902. <http://catalog.hathitrust.org/api/volumes/oclc/456912.html>.
- Hayashi, Tadamasa. Objets d'art du Japon et de la Chine; peintures, livres. Don't la vente aura lieu du lundi 27 janvier au samedi ler février 1902 inclus, dans les galeries de MM. Durand-Ruel. 1902.
- Hayashi, Tadamasa. Objects d'art du Japon et de la Chine: peintures, livres, réunis par T. Hayashi, don't la vente aura lieu du lundi 27 jan. au samedi 1er fév. 1902 inclus dans les galeries de mm. Durand-Ruel ... Commissaire-priseur: me P. Chevalier. [Paris]: [publisher not identified], 1902.
- Hayashi, Tadamasa. Histoire de l'art du Japon. de Brunhoff, 1900. <http://resolver.staatsbibliothek-berlin.de/SBB000152D400000000>.
- Hayashi, Tadamasa, and Riyuitci, Bn Kouki. Histoire de l'art du Japon. Paris: M. de Brunhoff, 1900.
- Ki, Yoshio, Mataichi Fujuchi, Tadamasa Hayashi, and Riyutci Kouki. Histoire de l'art du Japon: ouvrage publié par la Commission impériale du Japon à l'Exposition universelle de Paris, 1900. Paris: M. de Brunoff, 1900.
- Hayashi, Tadamasa, and Riyuitci, Bn Kouki. Histoire de l'art du Japon: ouvr. publ. par la Comm. Impér. du Japon à l'Exposition univ. de Paris, 1900. Paris: M. de Brunhoff, 1900.
- Hayashi, Tadamasa. Histoire de l'art du Japon: Commission Impériale du Japon à l'Exposition Universelle de Paris, 1900. Paris: [s.n.], 1900.
- Bauwens, Maurice, Tadamasa Hayashi, La Forgue, Julius Meier-Graefe, and Joseph Pennell. Les Affiches étrangères illustrées. Paris: G. Boudet, 1897.
- Meier-Graefe, Julius (1867-1935), Pennell, Joseph (1857-1926), La Forgue, Bauwens, Maurice, and Hayashi, Tadamasa (1853?-1906). Les affiches étrangères illustrées / par MM. M. Bauwens, T. Hayashi, La Forgue, Meier-Graefe, J. Pennell. G. Boudet (Paris), 1897. <http://gallica.bnf.fr/ark:/12148/bpt6k933493v>.
- Bauwens, Maurice, La Forgue, and Tadamasa Hayashi. Affiches étrangères illustrées: ouvrage orné de 62 lithographies en couleurs et de 150 reproductions en noir et en couleurs d'après les affiches originales des meilleurs artistes. Paris: Boudet, 1897.
- Bauwens, Maurice, Tadamasa Hayashi, Julius Meier-Graefe, Joseph Pennell, and La Forgue. Les Affiches étrangères illustrées: ouvrage orné de 62 [!] lithographies en couleurs et de cent cinquante reproductions en noir et en couleurs d'après les affiches originales des meilleurs artistes. Paris: G. Boudet [etc.], 1897.
- Hayashi, Tadamasa. Catalogue d'une collection de dessins et eaux-fortes par Paul Renouard. Paris: Gillot, 1894.
- Musée National du Louvre, and Tadamasa Hayashi. Catalogue de la collection de gardes de sabre japonaises au Musée du Louvre: don de Tadamasa Hayashi de Tokio. Paris: Hayashi, 1894.
- Renouard, Paul, and Tadamasa Hayashi. Catalogue d'une collection de dessins et eaux-fortes par Paul Renouard. Cette collection est destinée à être offerte par Tadamasa Hayashi à une musée de Tokio sur l'art européen. Exposition à la Bodinière, du 17 au 31 mai 1894. 1894.
- Hayashi, Tadamasa. Catalogue de la collection des gardes de sabre japonaises: au Musée du Louvre. Paris: T. Hayashi, 1894.
- Hayashi, Tadamasa. Catalogue de la collection des gardes de sabre japonaises au Musée du Louvre, don de M. Tadamasa Hayashi de Tôkiô. Paris: T. Hayashi, 1894.
- Hayashi, Tadamasa. Les douze faucons en bronze: Exposition Universelle Colombienne Chicago. Chicago: [s.n.], 1893.
- Hayashi, Tadamasa. Twelve Bronze Falcons Exhibited at the World's Columbian Exposition, Chicago 1893. Tokyo, Japan: [publisher not identified], 1893.
- World's Columbian Exposition, Tadamasa Hayashi, and Chokichi Suzuki. Twelve Bronze Falcons Exhibited at the World's Columbia Exposition, Chicago, 1893. Tokyo: [s.n.], 1893.
- Hayashi, Tadamasa. Ukiyoe shūsetsu. 浮世絵集說. S.1: s.n, 1892.
- Hayashi, Tadamasa. Collection Hayashi; Objets d'Art et Peintures de la Chine et du Japon reunis part T. Hayashi ancien commissaire général du Japon a l'exposition universellede 1900. Deuxième partie don't la vente aura lieu du lundi 16 février au samedi 21 février 1903 inclus a l'hotel drouot, salles nos 7 et 8. n.d.
- Illustrated catalogue of the important collection of paintings, water colors, pastels, drawings and prints collected by the Japanese connoisseur the late Tadamasa Hayashi of Tokyo, Japan, chief commissioner for the Japanese government to the exhibition universelle, Paris, 1900. Unrestricted Public Sale. Former owner: Charles Lang Freer. Publisher: The American Art Association, New York 1913
  - Biography Tadamasa Hayashi
- http://www.manabi-takaoka.jp/03/jpn/category/detail/75/1/detail.html (in Japanese)
- http://www.tym.ed.jp/kokusai/yukari/hayasi.html (in Japanese)
