= Chirashi-gaki =

Japanese verse form

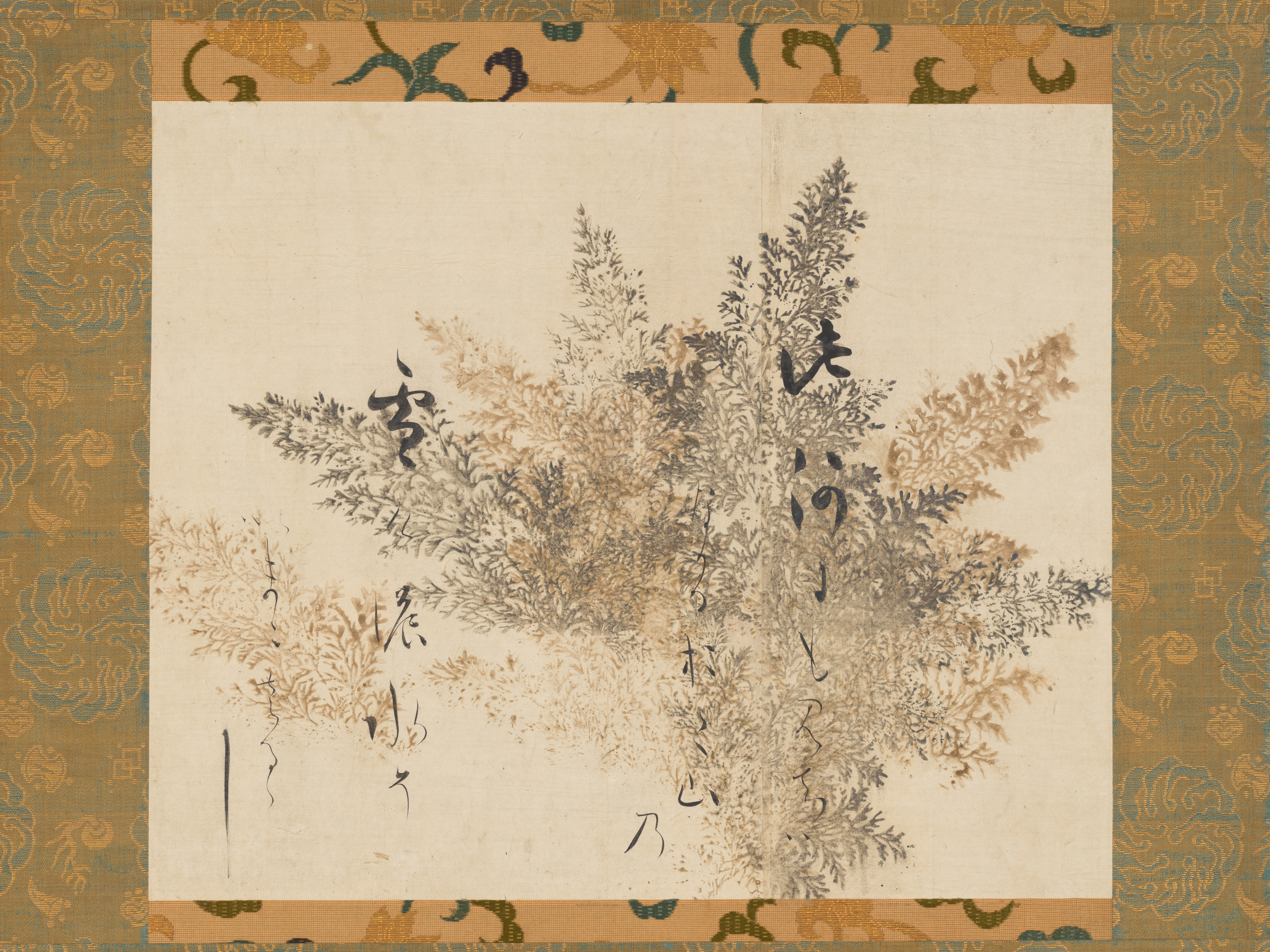
Chirashi-gaki calligraphy by Hon'ami Kōetsu, with a pattern printed using hinoki leaves dipped in gold and silver ink (early 17th century). Note dramatic differences in the weight of the calligraphic lines. The poem, from the Kokin wakashū, describes autumn leaves floating down on a meltwater spate from the mountains. It reads: 此河に もみぢばなかがる おく山の 雪げの水ぞ いまゝさるらし

Chirashi-gaki (散らし書き, ちらし書き), meaning "scattered writing", is a creative calligraphic form of versification used in Japanese, often for waka (tanka) poems, and in private letters. The calligrapher may choose to deliberately write the characters out of order, leaving the reader to puzzle out the correct sequence of characters to form the poem. Chirashigaki may also retain the order, but divide and space the characters unconventionally, with a column break partway through a poetic line or a word. It may also involve writing in darker or lighter ink, and beginning to write at various levels.

These techniques are used to give a sense of rhythm and depth, bringing the aesthetics of a painting to the calligraphy. Chirashi-gaki slows and delinearizes the reading process, changing the read rhythm. Chirashi-gaki effects are the subject of detailed academic study. They may appear spontaneous and random, but they are often very calculated and carefully-crafted.

Historically, it was also a convenient way of using expensive letter paper efficiently; it is now often done on shikishi paper. It became particularly popular among women in the Heian court (the Heian period is 794 to 1185) but subsequently remained popular.

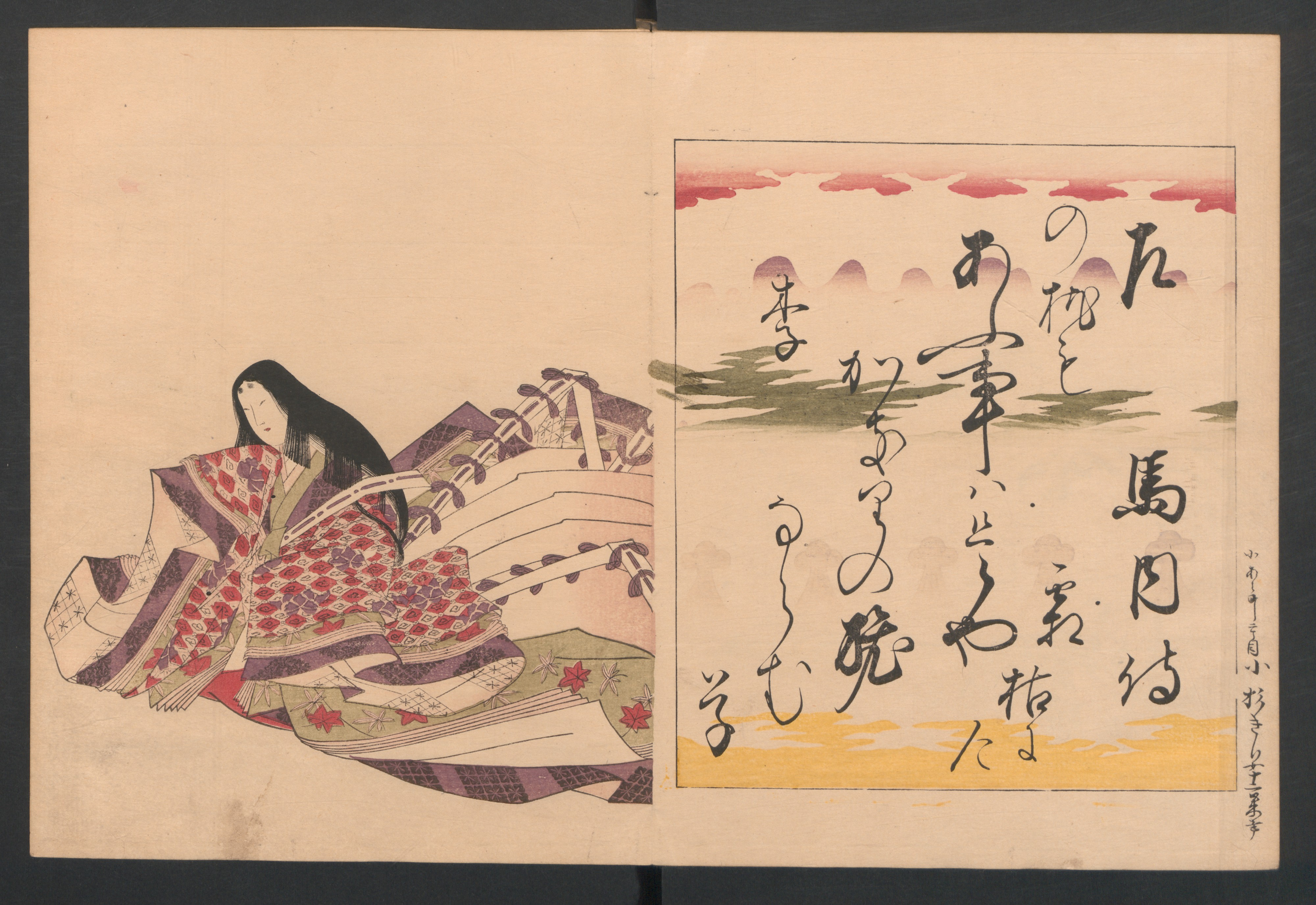
This poem by Uma no Naishi is written in chiragasaki, arranged by a schoolgirl studying calligraphy 790 years after the poet's death. The first part of the poem is written darkly in the third column from the right, while the second column from the right comes later in the poem. The third through sixth columns are written sequentially right-to-left but start successively further down the page; the remaining half of the poem is scattered among the earlier characters.

Kana-chirashi further varies the writing by using various different types of kana.

== In translation ==
Attempts have been made to render chirashi-gaki in English translations. The style has also inspired musical compositions.

The opera Da gelo a gelo, written in Italian, is based on the Diary of Izumi Shikibu. The seemingly-random jumps in pitch between the isolated melodic notes are intended to be reminiscent of chirashi-gaki.
