= Actor Ichikawa Ebijūrō as Samurai =

1823 Japanese print by Shunshosai Hokuchō

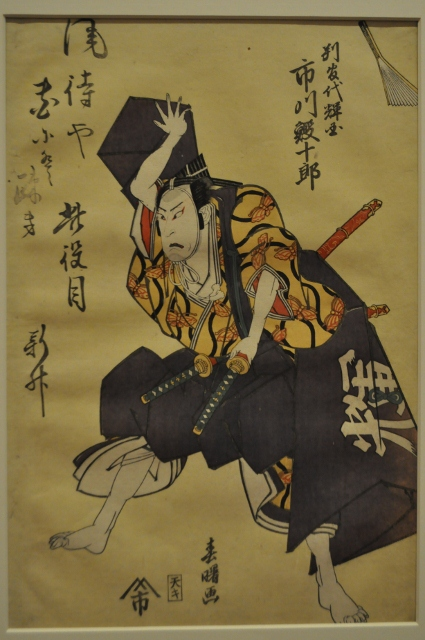
- Actor Ichikawa Ebijūrō as Samurai (Shunjosai Hokuchō)
- Artist: Shunshosai Hokuchō
- Year: 1823
- Type: nishiki-e woodblock print, ink and color on paper
- Dimensions: 37.3 cm × 26.2 cm (14 11/16 in × 10 5/16 in)
- Condition: on display (November 2013- )
- Location: Royal Ontario Museum; Toronto
- Accession: 974.343.4

Actor Ichikawa Ebijūrō as Samurai is an ukiyo-e Japanese woodblock print by Osaka-based late Edo period print designer Shunshosai Hokuchō (春曙斎 北頂) (fl. c. 1822-1830). The print depicts a scene from a kabuki play featuring Osaka actor Ichikawa Ebijūrō (市川蝦十郎) in the role of a samurai. One impression of the print belongs to the permanent collection of the Prince Takamado Gallery of Japanese Art in the Royal Ontario Museum, Canada.

== Print details ==
- Medium: kamigata nishiki-e (上方錦絵) woodblock print; ink and colour on paper
- Size: ōban tate-e (大判竪絵)
- Format: ichimai-e (一枚絵) single sheet print
- Genre: kabuki-e (歌舞伎絵), yakusha-e (役者絵) actor print
- Japanese title: 「判官代輝国」「市川蝦十郎」
- Exhibit title: Actor Ichikawa Ebijūrō as Samurai
- Date: 3rd month of 1823
- Signature: Shunsho ga [春曙画]
- Publishers' marks: Tenki [天キ] (Tenmaya Kihei), Yamaichi [山市]
- Censor seal: none
- Date seal: none
- Credit line: none

== Artist ==
Shunshosai Hokuchō (春曙斎 北頂) (fl. 1822–1830) was a Japanese ukiyo-e designer in Osaka. He was a member of the Shunkōsai Fukushū school, and a student of Shunkōsai Hokushū (春好斎北洲). He used the gō art names Shunsho (春曙) (1822–1824), Hokuchō (北頂) (1824-1830), Inoue Shunshosai (井上春曙斎). He was not very prolific, and all of his few surviving images are yakusha-e kabuki actor portraits.

Shunshosai Hokuchō signature

== Medium and genre ==
Hokuchō's works are categorized as kamigata-e (上方絵), a term used to distinguish prints produced in the Kamigata area (Kyoto and Osaka) from those produced in Edo. Kamigata-e were mainly kabuki-e (歌舞伎絵) images of kabuki actors, and were produced almost exclusively by amateur "talented kabuki fans" promoting their favourite actors.

== Publisher ==
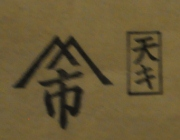
Yamaichi and Tenki hanmoto seals

The print displays two publisher seals. On the right is the mark of Kinkadō (金華堂) or Tenmaya Kihei (天満屋喜兵衛), commonly known as Tenki (天喜/天キ). The firm operated in Osaka from 1816 into the 1850s, and published works by Gigadō Ashiyuki, Konishi Hirosada, Shunbaisai Hokuei, Sadamasu and Ryusai Shigeharu among others. Tenki used various hanmoto (版元) publisher seals. This version features the kanji character 天 (ten) followed by the katakana character キ (ki) within a rectangle.

On the left, is one of at least three variants of the hanmoto used by Yamaichi (山市), which, between 1822 and 1824, produced images by artists such as Ashiyuki Gigadō, Hokushū, Kunihiro and Shibakuni. The seal on this print is the kanji character 市 (ichi) under a stylized double mountain (pron. yama).

== Subject ==
=== Ichikawa Ebijūrō I ===
The inscription to the right of the figure names him as actor Ichikawa Ebijūrō [市川蝦十郎] in the role of Hangandai Terukuni [判官代輝国]. The date of the print indicates that this is Ebijūrō I (c. 1777–1827), the first of seven generations of actors whose line ended in 1929.

Born in Osaka, Ebijūrō I was a tachiyaku (立役) (male role) and jitsuaku (実悪) (villain role) performer who appeared on the Osaka, Kyoto and Edo stages. He is noted for performing up to seven roles within a single play, as well as for impressive tachimawari (立回り) fight scenes and hayagawari (早替り) costume changes.

| Stage names | Ichikawa Ichizō I (c. 1808–1814) | Ichinokawa Ichizō (1815) | Ichikawa Ebijūrō I (1815–1827) |
| Poetry names | Shikaku | Shinshō | |
| Guild name | Harikaya | | |
| Mentors | Ichikawa Danzō IV | Ichikawa Danjūrō VII | |
| Disciples | Ichikawa Ebijūrō II | Ichikawa Ebijūrō III | |
| Artist portraits | Utagawa Toyokuni (1814, 1820) | Shunkōsai Hokushū (1816, 1820) | Utagawa Kunihiro (1817) |

=== Sugawara Denju Tenarai Kagami ===
The print depicts a scene from the jidaimono (時代物) history play Sugawara Denju Tenarai Kagami (菅原伝授手習鑑) (The Secrets of Calligraphy), "one of the 3 great masterpieces of Gidayū-kyōgen" (義太夫狂言). Originally written in 1746 for the ningyō jōruri (人形浄瑠璃) puppet theatre by Takeda Izumo I, Miyoshi Shōraku, Namiki Senryū I and Takeda Izumo II, it was first staged for kabuki the following year. The five-act play centres on Sugawara no Michizane (菅原道真), a tragic hero from the Heian period. Hangandai Terukuni is a minor character who acts as Sugawara's escort and as a representative of the retired Emperor Uda. Hokuchō's print commemorates a performance of the play at Osaka's Kado no Shibai theatre in the third month of 1823.

== Image ==
Ebijūrō is captured in a dramatic mie pose. He stands barefoot, feet planted wide apart, body bent forward at the waist. With a serious expression, he stares into the distance with his body angled in three quarter profile to the right. He appears to have been startled into a defensive pose. His right hand is raised above his head, and in the top-right corner of the image is a harisen (ハリセン)-type fan in mid-flight subsequent to having been tossed into the air. His left hand grips the sheath of one of the two swords on his left side, the customary position for samurai.

He wears a dark outer-kimono from which his arms have been removed to increase his mobility. On the upper half of the kimono hanging down below his waist is the character "輝", which starts the name Terukuni (輝国)". His yellow under-kimono is patterned with butterflies or moths. His hair is arranged in a chonmage top-knot, and the string visible around his head indicates that his eboshi hat has been knocked back.

The print's background is completely blank and coloured yellow, which was a particularly common choice for Hokuchō.

== Inscription ==
Along the right side of the print is an inscription written in a style of Japanese calligraphy known as cursive script. sōsho (草書), which translates literally as 'grass writing', is a highly stylized form of writing which is typically difficult for those not specifically trained to decipher. Hokuchō's inscription appears as five vertical columns at various heights containing two or three kanji or hiragana characters each. It is read from top to bottom, right to left. A partial transcription is as follows:

- 風 侍 や （kazezamurai ya）
- 志 ? ? (kokorozashi ? ?)
- 疎 ? (utou ?)
- ? 役 目 （? yakume）
- ? 升 (? masu)

== Copies in other collections ==
Versions of this print belong to the permanent collections of the following institutions:

- Art Research Center, Ritsumeikan University. "市川蝦十郎 判官代輝国 [Ichikawa Ebijūrō I / Hangandai Terukuni]".
- Museum of Fine Arts, Boston. "Actor Ichikawa Ebijūrō I as Hangandai Terukuni".

== Related images ==
Hangandai Terukuni is a popular subject in late Edo period ukiyo-e. He appears in many prints including:

- Utagawa Kunisada/ Toyokuni III. "Actor Kataoka Gatō II as Hangandai Terukuni (1860)".
- Utagawa Kunisada/ Toyokuni III. "Actor Arashi Kichisaburo III as Hangandai Terukuni (1850)".
- Utagawa Kunisada/ Toyokuni III. "Poem by Sei Shōnagon: Hangandai Terukuni and Kanshōjō (Sugawara Michizane), from the series Ogura Imitations of One Hundred Poems by One Hundred Poets (Ogura nazorae hyakunin isshu) (c. 1845-1848)".
- Konishi Hirosada. "Actors Okawa Hashizo as Kanshōjō and Ichikawa Shiko as Hangandai Terukuni (c. 1848)".
- Isshūsai Kunikazu. "Actor Arashi Kichisaburō III as Hangandai Terukuni (1859)".

== See also ==
- Ryūsai Shigeharu - kamigata-e artist
- Utagawa Kunimasu - kamigata-e artist
- Konishi Hirosada - kamigata-e artist
- Bust portrait of Actor Kataoka Ichizō I (Gochōtei Sadamasu II) - kamigata-e print in same collection
- View of Tempōzan Park in Naniwa (Gochōtei Sadamasu) - kamigata-e print in same collection
- Actor Arashi Rikan II as Osome (Ryūsai Shigeharu) - kamigata-e print in same collection
- Three Travellers before a Waterfall (Ryūsai Shigeharu) - kamigata-e print in same collection
- Actor Nakamura Shikan II as Satake Shinjuro (Shungyosai Hokusei) - kamigata-e print in same collection
- Two Actors in Samurai Roles (Gosotei Hirosada) - kamigata-e print in same collection
- Actor Ichikawa Shiko as Kato Yomoshichi (Gosotei Hirosada) - kamigata-e print in same collection
