= Shunshosai Hokucho =

Japanese ukiyo-e woodblock print artist

Shunshosai Hokuchō (春曙斎 北頂) (fl. 1822–1830) was a Japanese ukiyo-e woodblock print artist active in the Osaka area during the first half of the nineteenth century. He was a member of the Shunkōsai Fukushū school of artists, and studied under Shunkōsai Hokushū (春好斎北洲). His original surname was Inoue (井上), and he used the gō art names Shunsho (春曙) (1822-1824), Hokuchō (北頂) (1824-1830), Inoue Shunshosai (井上春曙斎).

Actor Ichikawa Ebijuro as Samurai

As an Osaka-based artist, Hokuchō's works are categorized as kamigata-e (上方絵), a term used to distinguish prints produced in the Kamigata area (Kyoto and Osaka) from those produced in Edo. Kamigata-e were predominantly kabuki-e (歌舞伎絵) images of kabuki actors, and were produced almost exclusively by amateur “talented kabuki fans” promoting their favourite actors rather than professional print designers.

== Works ==
Hokuchō was not a prolific artist and few prints attributed to him survive. Many of his prints are characterized by yellow backgrounds, and all of these images are yakusha-e kabuki actor portraits. Beyond Hokushū's characteristic Osaka style, his prints also show the influence of a style derived from Toyokuni I; what distinguishes Hokuchō's style is his intent to illustrate the theatrical scene itself, despite backgrounds that are generally absent or only summarily realistic. Actors featured in his works include Ichikawa Ebijūrō (市川蝦十郎), Nakamura Utaemon (中村歌右衛門), Onoe Kikugorō (尾上菊五郎), Nakamura Karoku (中村歌六), Nakamura Shikan (中村芝翫), Nakamura Kankurō (中村勘九郎), Arashi Rikan (嵐離寛), Seki Sanjūrō (関三十郎), and Nakamura Matsue (中村松江).

The majority of his prints were published by Honya Seishichi (本屋清七) (Honsei), although he also produced works for the firms Tenmaya Kihei (天満屋喜兵衛) (Tenki) and Yamaichi (山市). He regularly worked with Kasuke, one of the most esteemed woodblock carvers of the period.

Shunshosai Hokucho signature 01

Modern art historians and critics have not been overly impressed with Hokuchō's skill, describing him as "competent but limited", and less talented than his mentor, Hokushū.

== Collections ==
Works by Shunshosai Hokuchō belong to the permanent collections of various international museums including the following:

- Asian Art Museum
- Museum of Applied Arts, Vienna
- Cleveland Museum of Art
- Museum of Fine Arts, Boston
- Ritsumeikan University [立命館大学]
- Royal Ontario Museum
- Tokyo Municipal Library [東京都立図書館]
- Waseda University Tsubouchi Memorial Theatre Museum [演劇博物館]
- V & A Museum

== See also ==
- Ryūsai Shigeharu - kamigata-e artist
- Utagawa Kunimasu - kamigata-e artist
- Konishi Hirosada - kamigata-e artist
- Yoshida Hanbei - kamigata-e artist
- Actor Ichikawa Ebijūrō as Samurai (Shunshosai Hokuchō) - print by Hokuchō
