= Actor Nakamura Shikan II as Satake Shinjuro =

Actor Nakamura Shikan II as Satake Shinjūrō
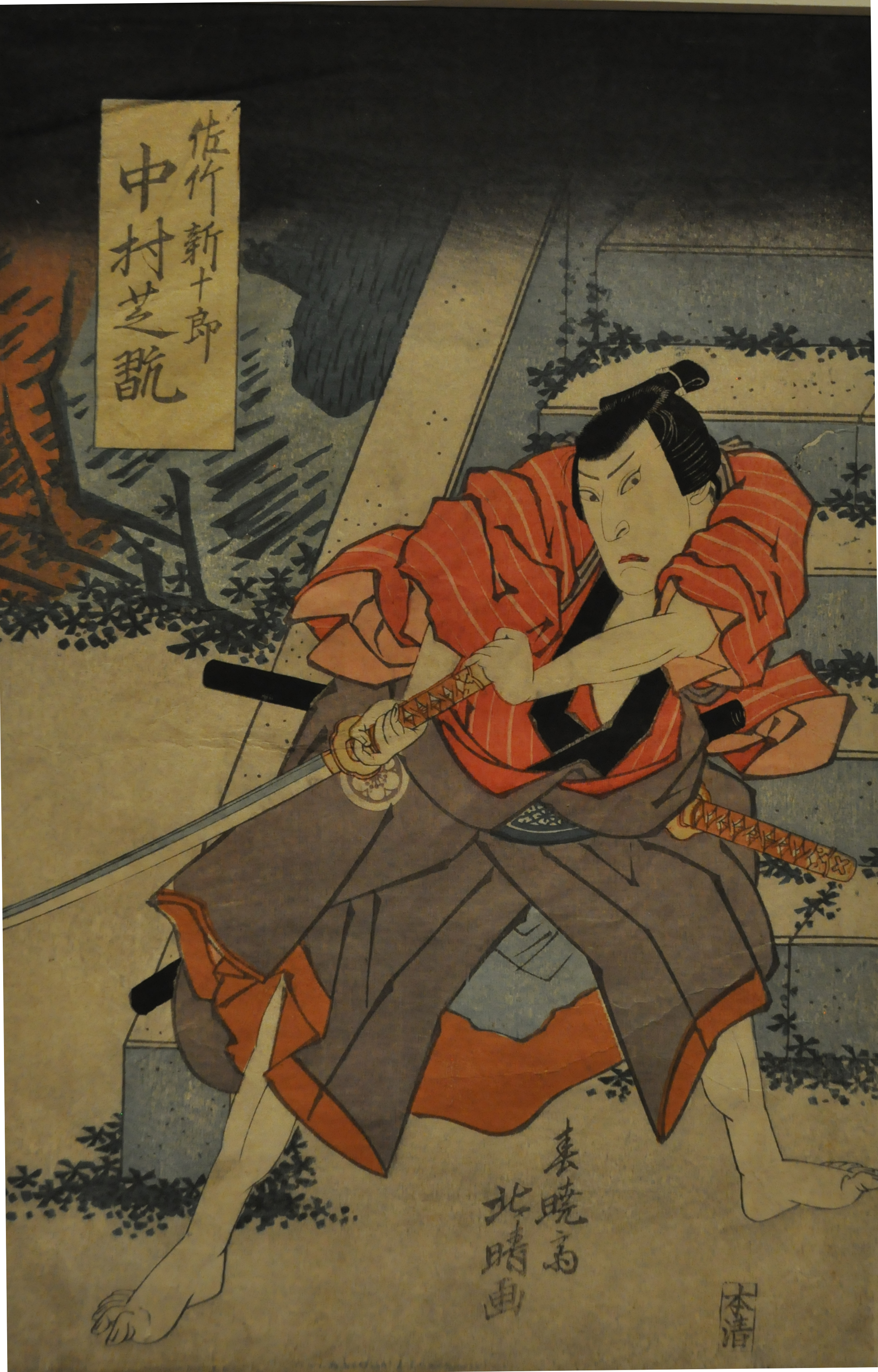
- Artist: Shungyōsai Hokusei
- Year: 1827
- Type: nishiki-e woodblock print, ink and color on paper
- Dimensions: 39 cm × 26.5 cm (15.6 in × 10.7 in)
- Condition: on display (November 2013 –)
- Location: Royal Ontario Museum; Toronto
- Accession: 974.343.2

Actor Nakamura Shikan II as Satake Shinjūrō is an ukiyo-e woodblock print by Osaka-based late Edo period print designer Shungyōsai Hokusei (fl. 1826–1827). It depicts celebrated kabuki actor Nakamura Shikan II as a character in the play Keisei Asoyama Sakura. The print belongs to the permanent collection of the Prince Takamado Gallery of Japanese Art in the Royal Ontario Museum, Canada.

== Print details ==
- Medium: kamigata nishiki-e (上方錦絵) woodblock print; ink and colour on paper
- Size: ōban tate-e (大判竪絵)
- Format: ichimai-e (一枚絵) single sheet print from a triptych
- Genre: yakusha-e (役者絵) actor print
- Japanese title: 佐竹新十郎 中村芝翫
- Exhibit title: Actor Nakamura Shikan II as Satake Shinjūrō
- Date: 1827
- Inscription: none
- Signature: Shungyōsai Hokusei ga (春暁斎北晴画)
- Publisher's mark: Honsei (本清)
- Publisher: Shōhon-ya Seishichi (正本屋清七)
- Censor seal: none
- Date seal: none
- Credit line: none

== Artist ==
Very little biographical information is available for Shungyōsai Hokusei. Although one source identifies his life dates as 1818 to 1829, most biographical records simply date his period of activity as being sometime between 1826 and 1828. Known predominantly for his yakusha-e kabuki actor portraits, he is named as a pupil of Shunkōsai Hokushū [春好斎北洲] (fl. 1810–1832) on one of the latter's prints.

Although associated with the gō Shungyōsai, Shungyōsai Hokusei is usually referred to as Hokusei. One reason for this is to distinguish him from two other Osaka-based ukiyo-e artists who shared the same gō: Shungyōsai I (c. 1760–1823; fl. 1790s–1820s) and his son Shungyōsai II (n.d.–1867; fl. 1820s–1860s).

Works by Shungyōsai Hokusei belong to the permanent collections of museums such as the Museum of Fine Arts Boston, the Royal Ontario Museum, Central Saint Martins Museum and Study Collection, the Tsubouchi Memorial Theatre Museum of Waseda University.

== Subject ==
=== Nakamura Shikan II ===
Nakamura Shikan II (1796–1852) was born Hirano Kichitarō, the son of an Edo tea house owner. In 1807, however, he was adopted by his uncle, a performer of traditional Japanese dance, and at age 15 he became the apprentice of kabuki actor Nakamura Utaemon III. As a kaneru yakusha, Shikan II was highly versatile, capable of performing a wide variety of male and female roles, often assuming multiple roles within the same performance. He was particularly admired for his dancing, his roles in jidaimono history plays, and his "large... stature... fine eyes and good features."

He used several stage names throughout his career, including Nakamura Tōtarō (1811–1813), Nakamura Tsurusuke I (1813–1825), Nakamura Utaemon IV (1836–1852), as well as Nakamura Shikan II which he took in 1825. He was also associated with the haimei (俳名) poetry names Kanjaku and Shijaku, and the guild name Narikomaya.

Shikan II's career was divided between Osaka and Edo, and despite his popularity on the Kamigata stage, he apparently wished to be more associated with the Edo theatre. He appears in prints by various artists, including Utagawa Kunisada, Utagawa Kunihiro, Utagawa Toyokuni and Shunbaisai Hokuei.

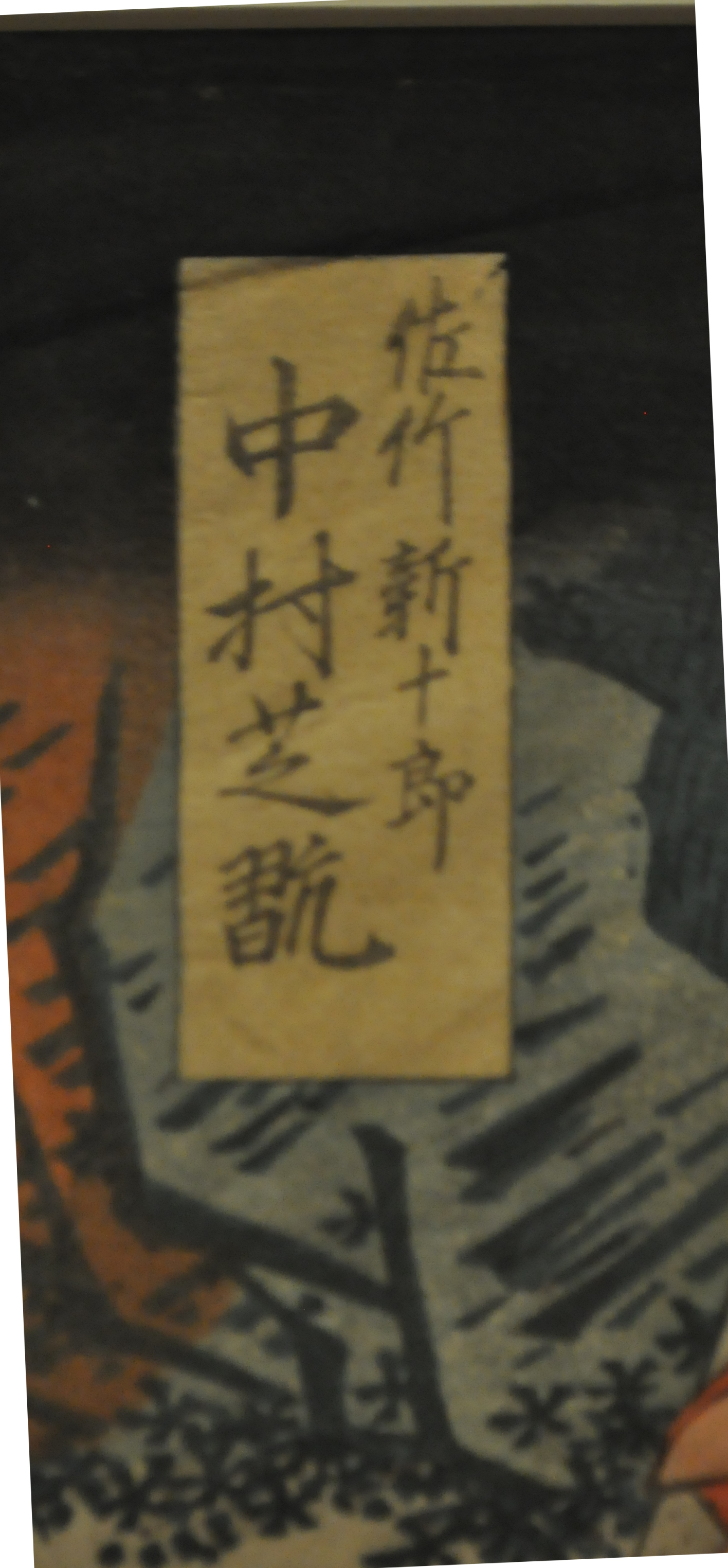
Name cartouche detail

=== Keisei Asoyama Sakura ===
The print depicts a scene from the kabuki play Keisei Asoyama Sakura (けいせい遊山桜), The Courtesan and the Cherry Blossoms at Mt. Aso. Unusually, the play was performed in the first lunar month of Bunsei 10 (文政十年), or 1827, at both Osaka's Naka (中) and Kado (角) Theatres simultaneously. Shikan II appeared in the version staged at the Kado in the role of Satake Shinjūrō (佐竹新十郎), alongside Edo actor Seki Sanjūrō II (関三十郎二代目) as Ishizuka Jinzaburō (石家仁三郎), onnagata Nakamura Matsue III (中村松枝三代目) as a keisei (傾城/契情) courtesan, and star Nakamura Utaemon III (中村歌右衛門) as Ōuchi Saemon Hidemaru (大内左衛門秀丸). Utaemon III is also credited with having written the Kado Theatre version of what is essentially a politico-historical thriller. The climax of the performance appears to have been a shosagoto dance featuring the three main stars.

== Description ==
The print depicts the character Satake Shinjūrō in a dramatic standing pose. His appearance is that of a samurai, his hair styled in a chonmage (丁髷) topknot, his feet bare. Her wears a short, bright red kimono decorated with thin white vertical stripes. Over this, he wears a simple grey haori (羽織) jacket whose only decoration is a flower motif kamon (家紋) family crest, which may be a plum blossom variant. His arms have been removed from the sleeves of his haori which hang down at his sides, and he has a sageo string holding back the long sleeves of his kimono. Both of these are intended to increase his mobility, particularly in combat.

The figure stands outdoors at the base of a set of stone steps with no visible detail aside from some undergrowth and rocks. He looks off to his right, which is to say away from the other two characters in the triptych. His face has a serious expression, and he holds a long unsheathed sword in front of him with both hands. The empty black saya (鞘) sheath is tucked into his blue patterned obi sash, and peeks out from behind his back along with a second matching sheathed sword. Both tsuka sword handles would peek out from his left side, the standard position for samurai as it made them more accessible for the right-handed.

== Medium and genre ==
As an Osaka-based artist, Shungyōsai Hokusei's works are categorized as kamigata-e (上方絵), a term used to distinguish prints produced in the Kamigata area (Kyoto and Osaka) from those produced in Edo. Gaining prominence about a century after the appearance of ukiyo-e in Edo, kamigata-e were predominantly kabuki-e (歌舞伎絵) (images of kabuki actors), and were almost entirely the work of amateur "talented kabuki fans" celebrating their favourite actors.

Literally "kabuki pictures", kabuki-e began to be produced in Edo in the late seventeenth century. As kabuki grew in popularity, star actors emerged, which in turn led to yakusha-e (役者絵), a subgenre of kabuki-e in which actors were depicted individually, as in this print, or in pairs. These images appeared as single-sheet prints or in books of actor prints called yakusha ehon (役者絵本).

== Publisher ==
The print bears the Honsei [本清] publisher's mark associated with the Shōhonya Seishichi [正本屋清七] publishing house. Honsei was a highly active Osaka publisher run by the Tamaoki Seishichi family. Dates for the company vary depending on the account, but fall generally span the nineteenth century, Honsei produced works by all of the prominent kamigata-e artists of the late nineteenth through the early twentieth centuries. In addition to Hokusei, they collaborated with such artists as:

- Hokuchō [北長] (fl. 1850s)
- Hokuei [北英] (fl. 1824–1837)
- Hokushū [北洲] (fl. 1810–1832)
- Kuniharu [國春] (fl. 1820s–1830s)
- Utagawa Kunimasu/ Sadamasu [國升/貞升] (fl. 1834–1852)
- Urakusai Nagahide [長秀] (fl. 1805–1842)
- Sadanobu [貞信] (fl. 1834–1879)
- Shigeharu/ Kunishige [重春/國重] (fl. 1821–1841?)
- Shunzan [春山] (fl. 1827–1829)
- Toyohide [豊秀] (fl. 1839–1841)

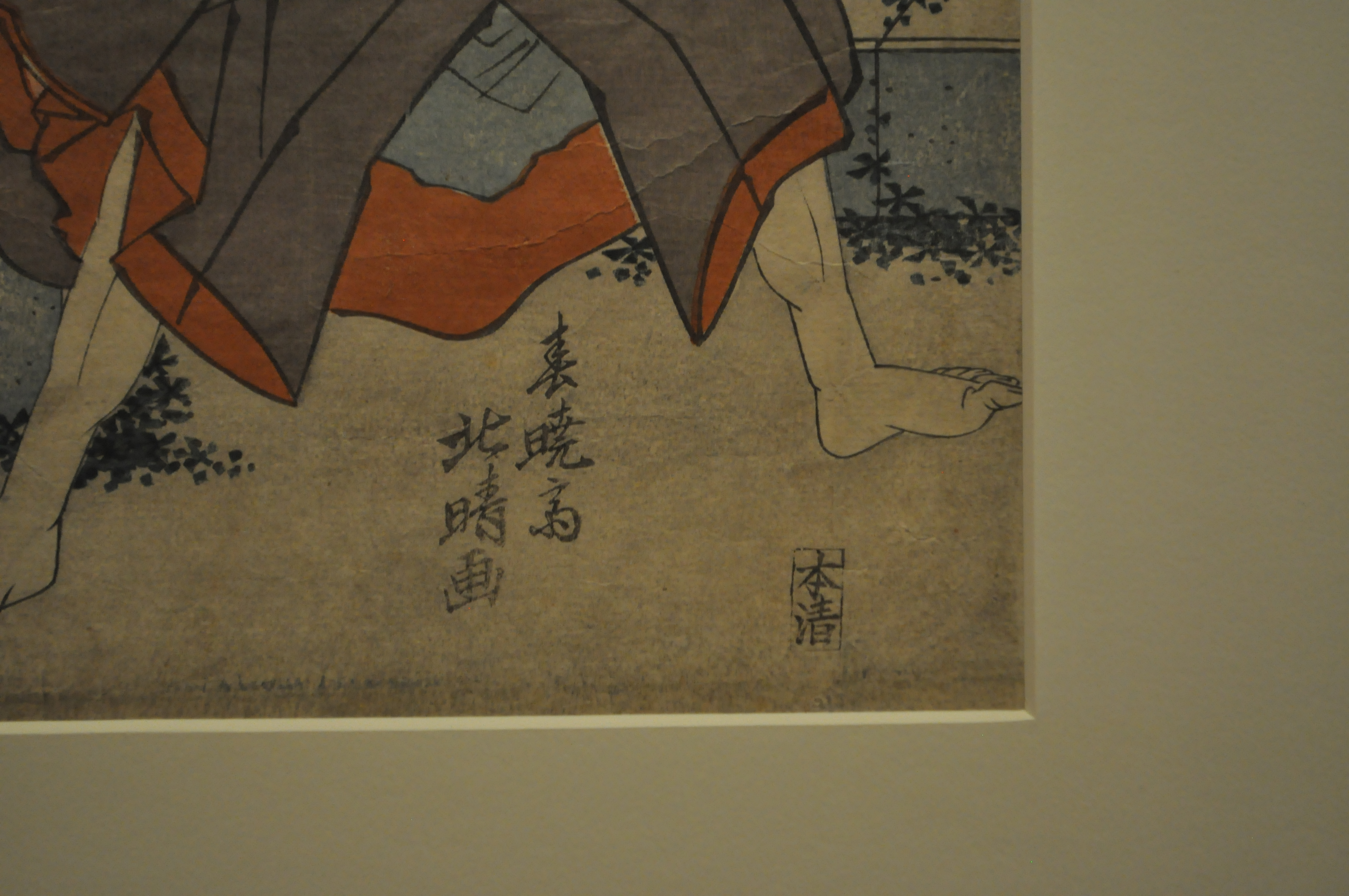
Signature and seal detail

== Related works ==
This print is Hokusei's contribution to a triptych produced by three different artists and published by Honsei soon after the 1827 performance. Although all three are the work of different artists they are stylistically cohesive and incorporate the same seamlessly matched background scene.

The placement of the actor/ character name cartouche near the left upper edge, indicates that this image is the left-most and third in the series. The two other images are Nakamura Utaemon III as Ōuchi Saemon Hidemaru by Shunshosai Hokuchō (centre), and Seki Sanjūrō II as Ishizuka Jinzaburō by Shunyōsai Shunshi (right).

== See also ==
- View of Tempōzan Park in Naniwa (Gochōtei Sadamasu) – kamigata-e print in same collection
- Actor Arashi Rikan II as Osome (Ryūsai Shigeharu) – kamigata-e print in same collection
- Bust portrait of Actor Kataoka Ichizō I (Gochōtei Sadamasu II) – kamigata-e print in same collection
- Ryūsai Shigeharu – kamigata-e artist
- Two Actors in Samurai Roles (Gosotei Hirosada) – kamigata-e print in same collection
