= Actor Ichikawa Shiko as Kato Yomoshichi (Gosotei Hirosada) =

Actor Ichikawa Shikō as Katō Yomoshichi from the series Tales of Retainers of Unswerving Loyalty
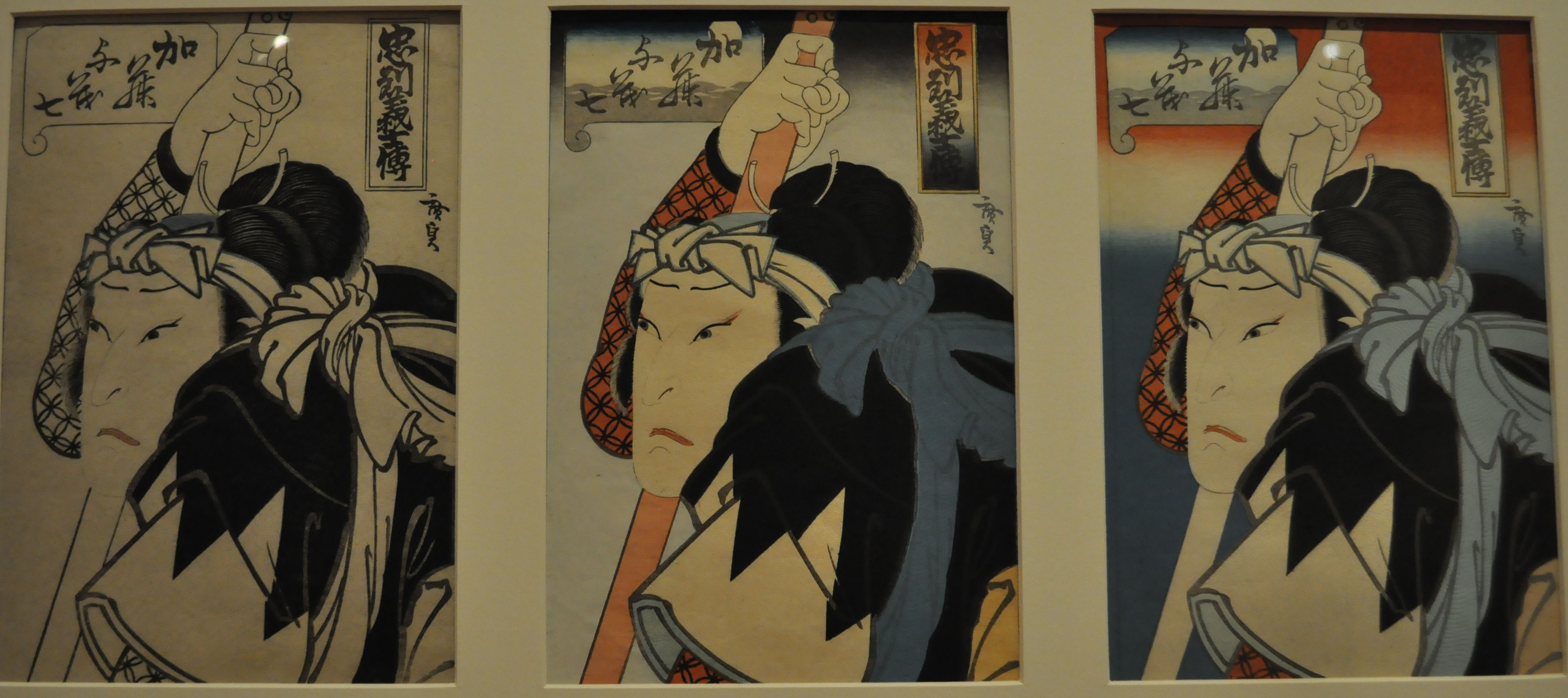
- Three versions from the series Tales of Retainers of Unswerving Loyalty (c. 1848)
- Artist: Gosōtei Hirosada
- Year: c. 1848
- Type: nishiki-e woodblock print, ink and color on paper
- Dimensions: 23.8 cm × 16.3 cm (9 3/8 in × 6 7/16 in)
- Condition: on display (November 2013 –)
- Location: Royal Ontario Museum, Toronto
- Accession: 994.56.1-3

Actor Ichikawa Shikō as Katō Yomoshichi from the series Tales of Retainers of Unswerving Loyalty is an ukiyo-e woodblock print by Osaka-based late Edo period print designer Gosōtei Hirosada (五粽亭廣貞) (fl. c. 1819-1863). Each of the three sheets contains a different version of the same image, reflecting progressive stages in the woodblock printing process. The print is a portrait of a contemporary kabuki actor in the role of a samurai, and belongs to a series of images of heroes. The print belongs to the permanent collection of the Prince Takamado Gallery of Japanese Art in the Royal Ontario Museum, Canada.

== Print details ==
- Medium: kamigata nishiki-e (上方錦絵) woodblock print; ink and colour on paper
- Size: chūban (中判)
- Format: 3 ichimai-e (一枚絵) single sheet prints
- Genre: kabuki-e (歌舞伎絵), yakusha-e (役者絵) actor print, ōkubi-e (大首絵) large head portrait
- Japanese title: 「忠烈義士伝」 「加藤与茂七」 [Chūretsu gishiden Katō Yomoshichi]
- Exhibit title: Actor Ichikawa Shikō as Katō Yomoshichi from the series Tales of Retainers of Unswerving Loyalty in 3 versions
- Date: c. 1848
- Inscription: none
- Signature: 廣貞 [Hirosada] in upper half along right edge
- Publisher's mark: none visible
- Censor seal: none
- Date seal: none
- Credit line: none

== Artist ==
Despite his status as "the most important and prolific mid-nineteenth century Osaka designer," little is known of Hirosada's personal details. The few biographies listing his life dates identify his birth year as unknown and that of his death as 1864 or 1865. Art historians link his activity to between 1810 and 1865. He has been acknowledged as "the central figure of mid-nineteenth century Osaka printmaking." He was very prolific, producing predominantly kabuki-e and yakusha-e chūban prints. He is particularly known for his ōkubi-e (lit. "large head") portraits of leading Osaka actors such as this print.

Hirosada used a number of gō art names throughout his career, including Gosōtei Hirosada (五粽亭廣貞), Konishi Hirosada (小西廣貞) and Utagawa Hirosada (歌川廣貞). He apparently began his career as Hirokuni (廣國/ 広国), switching to Hirosada in mid-1847. Some have suggested that Hirosada and his contemporary Utagawa Sadahiro (歌川貞廣) (fl. 1830-1847) were the same person; however, this remains unproven.

== Subject ==
=== Ichikawa Shikō III ===
As with Hirosada, little is known about the personal life of Ichikawa Shikō (市川市紅). He was born the son of a carpenter, but became the student then adopted son of kabuki actor Ichikawa Danzō V (市川団蔵). He was known by various names during his career including the following:

- Stage names
  - Ichikawa Morinosuke II (市川森之助)
  - Ichikawa Danzaburō VI (市川段三郎) (1/1844-1/1846)
  - Ichikawa Shikō III (市川市紅) (1/1846-8/1850)
  - Ichikawa Tōshō (市川当升/ 市川當升) (8/1850-?)
- Yagō guild name
  - Mikawaya (三河屋)
- Haimyō poetry name
  - Shikō (市紅)
  - Tōshō (当升/ 當升)

The last known mention of his name in print is in 1851, so it is presumed that he died in this year or soon after.

=== Kanadehon Chūshingura ===
This print and the several others in the series from which it is taken depict characters from a staging of the play Kanadehon Chūshingura (仮名手本忠臣蔵) performed in Osaka in the third month of 1848. The play was originally written for the bunraku puppet theatre by Takeda Izumo II, Miyoshi Shōraku and Namiki Senryū I in 1748, and adapted for kabuki later that year. It remains one of the most famous and popular plays in the kabuki repertoire.

A jidaimono historical drama, the play tells the ostensibly true and pervasively enduring story of a 1702 incident known as the Akō Affair, in which 47 loyal retainers of a wronged lord avenged his death then committed ritual seppuku suicide. The story of the 47 ronin has long been repeated and romanticized as an idealization of the bushido ethos, and held particular appeal during the latter half of the Tokugawa era despite, or perhaps in part due to, strict censorship imposed on re-tellings of the incident by the shogunate.

== Series ==
The print belongs to a series of six known prints translated as Tales of Retainers of Unswerving Loyalty or The Exemplary Loyalty of the Faithful Samurai. Like the characters from the play depicted in each image from the series, Katō Yomoshichi is one of the loyal retainers of the provincial lord Enya Hangan. The others are as follows:

- "Actor Arashi Rikaku II (嵐璃珏) as Yazama Jūtarō (矢間十太郎)".
- "Actor Jitsukawa Enzaburō (実川延三郎) as Ōtaka Gengo (大高源吾)".
- "Actor Jitsukawa Enzaburō (実川延三郎) as Hayano Kanpei (早野勘平)".
- "Actor Ichikawa Ebizō V (市川海老蔵) as Ōboshi Yuranosuke (大星由良之助)".
- "Actor Kataoka Ichizō (片岡市蔵) as Teraoka Heiemon (寺岡平右衛門)".

Hirosada produced multiple albums of this type portraying popular actors of the day as heroic warriors, including 忠孝武勇伝 (Chūka buyūden) ("Tales of Loyalty and Filial Devotion") and 高名武勇伝 (Kōmei buyūden) ("Tales of Brave Warriors of Renown" or "Tales of Renowned Heroes"), both issued in 1848. Doesburg has argued that such collections are attempts to circumvent censorship of kabuki-themed ukiyo-e under the Tenpō Reforms by cloaking the dramatic content within titles suggesting the promotion of moral values and "suggesting that the portraits were actually representations of famous men and women from history and legend".

== Medium and genre ==
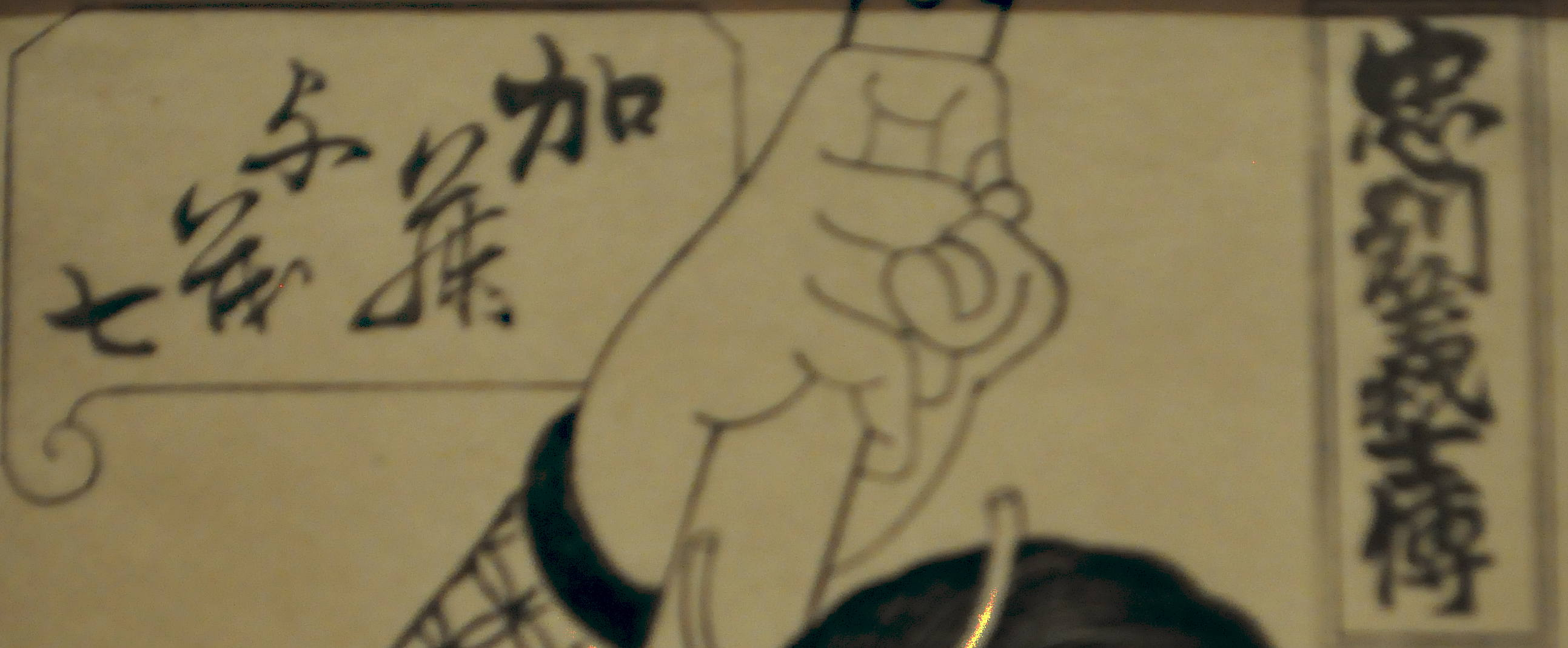
Character name cartouche (l) and series title (r) detail

=== Kamigata-e ===
Gosōtei Hirosada's works are categorized as kamigata-e (上方絵), a term used to distinguish prints produced in the Kamigata area (Kyoto and Osaka) from those produced in Edo. Gaining prominence about a century after the emergence of ukiyo-e in Edo, kamigata-e were predominantly kabuki-e (歌舞伎絵) (images of kabuki actors), and were produced almost exclusively by amateur "talented kabuki fans" promoting their favourite actors.

=== Kabuki-e ===
Literally 'kabuki pictures', kabuki-e began to be produced in Edo in the late seventeenth century. As kabuki grew in popularity, stars emerged, which in turn led to the yakusha-e (役者絵) (actor print) subgenre. Further subgenres of yakusha-e include ōkubi-e (大首絵) bust portraits, zenshin-zu (全身図) full-length portraits, mitate-e (見立絵) parody pictures, and shini-e (死に絵) death portraits.

=== Ōkubi-e ===
Ōkubi-e prints, also known as ōgao-e (大顔絵), are close-up ukiyo-e head shots of actors or beautiful women. Hirosada's print bears many of the typical marks of this genre including the plain background, the dramatic posing of the hands and arms, and the emphasis on facial features and make-up. Hirosada is particularly associated with this genre of print due to both the number and quality of works of this type that he produced.

== Copies in other collections ==
- Art Research Centre, Ritsumeikan University. "忠烈義士伝 加藤与茂七".
- Museum of Fine Arts, Boston. "Actor Ichikawa Shikô II as Katô Yomoshichi, from the series The Exemplary Loyalty of the Faithful Samurai (Chûretsu gishi den)".

== See also ==
- View of Tempōzan Park in Naniwa (Gochōtei Sadamasu) - kamigata-e print in same collection
- Actor Arashi Rikan II as Osome (Ryūsai Shigeharu) - kamigata-e print in same collection
- Bust portrait of Actor Kataoka Ichizō I (Gochōtei Sadamasu II) - kamigata-e print in same collection
- Ryūsai Shigeharu - kamigata-e artist
- Three Travellers before a Waterfall (Ryūsai Shigeharu) - kamigata-e print in same collection
- Actor Nakamura Shikan II as Satake Shinjuro (Shungyosai Hokusei) - kamigata-e print in same collection
- Two Actors in Samurai Roles (Gosotei Hirosada) - print in same collection by same artist
