= Hokuei =

Hokuei may refer to:

- Hokuei, Tottori, a town located in Tōhaku District of Tottori, Japan
- Shunbaisai Hokuei, a designer of ukiyo-e style Japanese woodblock prints
