= Ichizō =

- Gender: Male
- Language: Japanese

Origin
- Region of origin: Japan

Ichizō, also written Ichizo, Ichizou or Ichizoh is a Japanese masculine given name. People with this name include:

- Ichizō Kobayashi (小林一三, 1873–1953), Japanese industrialist
- Ichizo Nakata (中田一三, born 1973), Japanese football player
- Kataoka Ichizo (片岡市蔵), kabuki stage name which originated in early 19th-century Osaka
