= Two Actors in Samurai Roles (Gosotei Hirosada) =

Two Actors in Samurai Roles from the series "Tales of Brave Warriors of Renown"
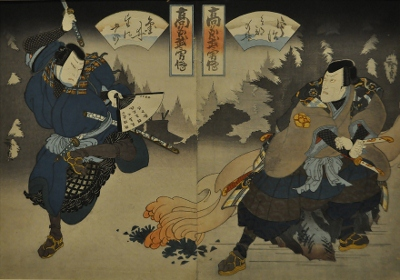
- Two Actors in Samurai Roles (Gosōtei Hirosada)
- Artist: Gosōtei Hirosada
- Year: 1847–1850
- Type: nishiki-e woodblock print, ink and color on paper
- Dimensions: 26 cm × 19 cm (10 in × 7.5 in)
- Condition: on display (November 2013- )
- Location: Royal Ontario Museum; Toronto
- Owner: Royal Ontario Museum
- Accession: 974.343.6a-b

Two Actors in Samurai Roles from the series "Tales of Brave Warriors of Renown" is an ukiyo-e woodblock print diptych by Osaka-based late Edo period print designer Gosōtei Hirosada (五粽亭廣貞) (fl. c. 1819-1863). Each sheet depicts a kabuki actor as a samurai, and belongs to a series of prints celebrating illustrious figures in Japan's martial tradition. The print belongs to the permanent collection of the Prince Takamado Gallery of Japanese Art in the Royal Ontario Museum, Canada.

== Print details ==
- Medium: kamigata nishiki-e (上方錦絵) woodblock print; ink and colour on paper
- Size: chūban tate-e (中判竪絵)
- Format: 2 ichimai-e (一枚絵) single sheet prints creating a diptych
- Genre: kabuki-e (歌舞伎絵), yakusha-e (役者絵) actor print
- Japanese title: 「高名武勇伝」「宇治兵部の介」 & 「高名武勇伝」「金井たに五郎」
- Exhibit title: Two Actors in Samurai Roles from the series "Tales of Brave Warriors of Renown"
- Date: 1847–1850
- Inscription: none
- Signature: 廣貞 [Hirosada] in white spaces among foliage on outside edge of either print
- Publisher's mark: none visible
- Censor seal: none
- Date seal: none
- Credit line: none

== Image ==
=== Series ===
The prints are taken from the print series 高名武勇伝 (Kōmei buyūden), which is translated as "Tales of Brave Warriors of Renown" or "Tales of Renowned Heroes." Hirosada produced multiple albums of this type including over one hundred heroic warrior images as single sheets and polytychs, including 忠孝武勇伝 (Chūka buyūden) ("Tales of Loyalty and Filial Devotion") also issued in 1848. Doesburg has argued that such print collections reflect an attempt to circumvent censorship of kabuki-themed ukiyo-e under the Tenpō Reforms by cloaking the dramatic content in titles that imply the promotion of moral values and "suggesting that the portraits were actually representations of famous men and women from history and legend." Although these images date from the period immediately after the easing of the Tenpō restrictions, they appear to be riding this trend.

=== Play ===
The scene in this diptych is taken from the play Go Taiheiki Shiroishi Banashi (碁太平記白石噺). Originally written in 1780 for the ningyō jōruri puppet theatre by Kijō Tarō (紀上太郎),Utei Enba (烏亭焉馬) and Yō Yōtai (容楊黛), the play was soon adapted for the kabuki stage. The seventh act, commonly referred to as "Ageya", is still performed on a regular basis.

Made up of eleven acts, the play is part jidaimono historical drama and part sewamono contemporary drama. It recounts the story of the Keian Uprising of 1651 led by Yui Shōsetsu (由井正雪) (d. 1651), a commoner who rose to prominence as an expert swordsman and martial artist. Frustrated by the increasingly strict regulations placed on the samurai, Yui and a small band of rōnin attempted to stage a coup against the ruling Tokugawa shogunate. The plot was discovered, Yui arrested and ultimately allowed to commit seppuku ritual suicide. The other section of the play tells the story of a revenge plot hatched by two long-lost sisters. Reunited in an Edo brothel, the two women plan to exact vengeance on the evil samurai who killed their farmer father.

The diptych is taken from a performance of the play which was staged in the eighth month of 1848 at Osaka's Kado Theatre. The print on the right is of the actor Ichikawa Ebizō as Uji Hyōbu-no-suke (宇治兵部助)(also Uji Jōetsu (宇治常悦)), a fictionalized version of rebel leader Yui Shōsetsu. The left print shows Arashi Rikan as Kanae Tanigorō (金井たに五郎) (also 金江谷五郎 (Kanai Yagorō)).

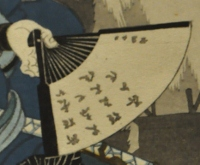
from the series Tales of Brave Warriors of Renown

=== Description ===
The diptych depicts two samurai facing each other in dramatic combative poses. They both wear waraji straw sandals, dark blue thigh-length kimono, and light blue obi tied casually around their waists. Both figures have chonmage topknots and carry two swords tucked into their obi. The figure on the left stands in an active pose with one foot off the ground. With his right hand he raises a sword over his head, and in his left he profers an ōgi folding fan with writing—possibly a poem—on it. The figure on the right wears a more elaborate kimono, which includes a haori jacket decorated with a flower kamon family crest on the sleeve and shoulder. He stands with his legs widely and firmly planted, about to grab his sword.

The scene takes place outdoors against the backdrop of pinetrees. Like the sky and ground which are grey with no detail, the trees appear simply as silhouettes. Among the trees in the background is the shadow of a building with a traditional thatched roof. On the ground between the two figures is a fire.

== Subjects ==
=== Arashi Rikan III ===
Born in 1812, Rikan III began his stage career appearing with his father's travelling actor troupe. As a youth, however, he began studying kabuki under the head of the Arashi Rikan family, Arashi Rikan II. He performed very frequently on the Osaka, Edo and Kyoto stages. although especially praised for his tachiyaku (male heroes) and onnagata female roles, he has been described as "an outstanding kaneru yakusha," which is to say he was capable of performing a wide variety of both male and female roles. He was particularly praised for his powerful physique and voice, as well as his shamisen playing. Rikan III remained active on the stage until his death in 1863. He is buried on the grounds of Hōzenji Temple in the Dōtombori entertainment district of Osaka.

Stage names	Poetry name	Other names	Guild name	Mentors	Disciples
Onoe Wasaburō (c. 1830); Arashi Tokusaburō III (1830-1834, 1837-1843); Arashi Kicchō (1834-1843); Arashi Rikan III (1843-1863)	Kicchō	Ichikawa Jukai I; Matsumoto Kōshir; Hatagaya Jūzō; Naritaya Shichizaemon II; Ichikawa Sanshō IV	Hamuraya	Arashi Rikan II; Onoe Tamizō II	Arashi Minshi VI; Arashi Kan'emon; Arashi Rikan IV

=== Ichikawa Ebizō V ===
Born in Edo in 1791, Ebizō was the son of a shibai jaya (theatre tea-house) owner and grandson of Ichikawa Danjūrō V, one of the biggest kabuki stars of his day. He first appeared on the stage in 1794 at the age of three, and went on to become an "outstanding tachiyaku [actor of male roles] and the most popular actor of the nineteenth century." He is described as "highly original", and as being particularly skilled at performing multiple roles within the same play and the requisite quick changes.

Ebizō V gained infamy in the summer of 1842 when he was found to be in violation of the restrictive sumptuary laws imposed through the Tempō Reforms. He was arrested and temporarily banished from Edo to Kamigata on the grounds that his ostentatious lifestyle was deemed to be irreconcilable with the Tokugawa bakufu's call for modesty and frugality. He was able to return seven years later, and had a very active career until his death in 1859. His sons continued his tradition, and both the Danjūrō and Ebizō lines continue to this day.

Stage names	Poetry names	Other names	Guild name	Mentors	Disciples
Ichikawa Shinnosuke I (1794-1797); Ichikawa Ebizō V (1797-1807, 1856-1859); Ichikawa Danjūrō VII (1807-); Ichikawa Hakuen II	Sanshō; Jukai; Hakuen	Ichikawa Jukai I; Matsumoto Kōshirō (1855); Hatagaya Jūzō; Naritaya Shichizaemon II (1854); Ichikawa Sanshō IV	Naritaya	Ichikawa Ebizō IV	Ichikawa Kodanji III; Ichikawa Kodanji IV; Ichikawa Ebijūrō I, Ichikawa Ebijūrō IV, Ichikawa Sumizō III, Ichikawa Shinsha, Ichikawa Monnosuke V, Ichikawa Omezō II, Ichikawa Dankurō I, Ichikawa Suminojō, Ichikawa Sadanji II, Ichikawa Sadanji III, Ichikawa Raizō V, Ichikawa Danshirō III

== Medium and genre ==
=== Kamigata-e ===
Gosōtei Hirosada's works are categorized as kamigata-e (上方絵), a term used to distinguish prints produced in the Kamigata area (Kyoto and Osaka) from those produced in Edo. Gaining prominence about a century after the emergence of ukiyo-e in Edo, kamigata-e were predominantly kabuki-e (歌舞伎絵) (images of kabuki actors), and were produced almost exclusively by amateur “talented kabuki fans” promoting their favourite actors.

=== Kabuki-e ===
Literally 'kabuki pictures', kabuki-e began to be produced in Edo in the late seventeenth century. As kabuki grew in popularity, stars emerged, which in turn led to the yakusha-e (役者絵) (actor print) subgenre. Further subgenres of yakusha-e include ōkubi-e (大首絵) bust portraits, zenshin-zu (全身図) full-length portraits, mitate-e (見立絵) parody pictures, and shini-e (死に絵) death portraits.

== See also ==
- View of Tempōzan Park in Naniwa (Gochōtei Sadamasu) - kamigata-e print in same collection
- Actor Arashi Rikan II as Osome (Ryūsai Shigeharu) - kamigata-e print in same collection
- Bust portrait of Actor Kataoka Ichizō I (Gochōtei Sadamasu II) - kamigata-e print in same collection
- Ryūsai Shigeharu - kamigata-e artist
- Three Travellers before a Waterfall (Ryūsai Shigeharu) - kamigata-e print in same collection
- Actor Nakamura Shikan II as Satake Shinjuro (Shungyosai Hokusei) - kamigata-e print in same collection

== Related works ==
- Actors Kataoka Gadô II as Matsugae Tetsunosuke and Arashi Rikan III as Saibara Kageyu (3/1848) from the series Tales of Renowned Heroes. "Museum of Fine Arts, Boston". Archived from the original on 2014-05-28.
- Actor Arashi Rikan (嵐璃寛) in the play Meiboku Sendai Hagi (伽羅先代萩) (3/1848) from the series "Tales of Renowned Heroes". "Art Research Centre, Ritsumeikan University". Archived from the original on 2014-05-28.
- Actor Jitsukawa Enzaburō (実川延三郎) in the play Azuma Miyage Date no Hinagata (東都産伊達雛形) (8/1848) from the series "Tales of Renowned Heroes". "Art Research Centre, Ritsumeikan University". Archived from the original on 2014-04-02.
- Actor Kataoka Ichizō (片岡市蔵) in the play Azuma Miyage Date no Hinagata (東都産伊達雛形) (8/1848) from the series "Tales of Renowned Heroes" (8/1848). "Art Research Centre, Ritsumeikan University".
- Actor Mimasu Daigorō (三枡大五郎) in the play Azuma Miyage Date no Hinagata (東都産伊達雛形) (8/1848) from the series "Tales of Renowned Heroes". "Art Research Centre, Ritsumeikan University". Archived from the original on 2014-04-03.
