= Three Travellers before a Waterfall =

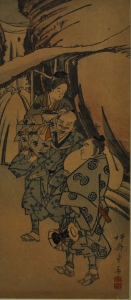
- Three Travellers by a Waterfall (Ryusai Shigeharu)
- Artist: Ryūsai Shigeharu
- Year: 1825-1850
- Type: nishiki-e woodblock print, ink and color on paper
- Condition: on display (November 2013- )
- Location: Royal Ontario Museum; Toronto
- Owner: Royal Ontario Museum; Gift of Sir Edmund Walker
- Accession: 926.18.1072

Three Travellers before a Waterfall is an ukiyo-e woodblock print by Osaka-based late Edo period print designer Ryūsai Shigeharu (柳斎 重春) (1802–1853). It depicts a light-hearted scene of two men and one woman travelling on foot through the country-side. The print belongs to the permanent collection of the Prince Takamado Gallery of Japanese Art in the Royal Ontario Museum, Canada.

== Print details ==
- Medium: kamigata nishiki-e (上方錦絵) woodblock print; ink and colour on paper
- Format: tate-e (縦絵) vertical print; ichimai-e (一枚絵) single sheet print
- Genre: fūzokuga (風俗画) genre scene
- Japanese title: none
- Exhibit title: Three Travellers by a Waterfall
- Inscription: none
- Signature: Ryūsai Shigeharu (柳斎重春画) in bottom right corner
- Publisher's mark: none
- Publisher's seal: none
- Censor seal: none
- Date seal: none
- Credit line: none

== Artist ==
Though Ryūsai Shigeharu (柳窗重春/柳斎重春) (1802/3–1853) was born in Nagasaki, Kyushu, he moved to Osaka around 1820. He began to study under Utagawa (Takigawa) Kunihiro (歌川国広) (fl. c.1815-1841), then under Yanagawa Shigenobu (柳川重信) (1787–1832). His first print was published in 1820 under the name Nagasaki Kunishige (長崎国重), one of the various gō he used during his career. He took the name Ryūsai Shigeharu in 1825. He worked in several media including single-sheet prints, book illustration, theater billboards, and painting. He was active between c.1820 and 1849, and was, if not the only professional ukiyo-e artist in Osaka in the late nineteenth-century, one of the very few on the amateur-dominated scene.

== Subject ==
In the fore- and mid-ground of the scene, three travellers, two adult males and one youth, walk along a path in the countryside against the backdrop of a waterfall. The men wear waraji straw sandals, kyahan leggings, swords, and their kimono arranged such that the hems graze their calves in the style of Edo period travellers. All three figures wear variations of eboshi hats and light blue kimono; however each garment bears a different motif. In addition, each figure is carrying something. The boy carries a closed ōgi folding fan, the central figure carries the boy on his shoulder, and the figure in the foreground carries a small kotsuzumi (小鼓) drum in his left hand and a large white bundle in his right.

== Medium and genre ==
Ryūsai Shigeharu spent his most productive years in Osaka, and as such his works are categorized as kamigata-e (上方絵). This term was used to distinguish prints produced in the Kamigata region (Kyoto and Osaka) from those produced in Edo. Gaining prominence about a century after the appearance of ukiyo-e in Edo, kamigata-e were dominated by kabuki-e (images of kabuki actors), and were almost entirely the work of amateur “talented kabuki fans” promoting their heroes. Shigeharu was a rare exception to this rule.

Although the "waterfall" of the print's title might suggest that the print belongs the fūkeiga (風景画) landscape genre, the focal point is the trio of travellers in the foreground. The image is related more closely to the fūzokuga (風俗画) 'genre scene' tradition. Also translated as "pictures of manners and customs," these images of common people engaged in popular activities appealed to ukiyo-e consumers through "a tremendous sense of immediacy, a feeling that he or she is right there participating in the scene." During the later years of the Edo period "travel became a popular form of leisure and the pleasures of the natural environment, interesting landmarks, and the adventures encountered on a journey became a popular inspiration for Ukiyo-e landscape prints and books."

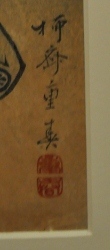
Three Travellers by a Waterfall (Ryusai Shigeharu) signature detail

== Provenance ==
The print was donated to the ROM by Sir Edmund Walker (1848–1924), long-time president of the Canadian Bank of Commerce and first Chairman of the Board of Trustees for the ROM. Walker began collecting Japanese art in the 1870s, making him one of the earliest North American collectors. He bought many pieces in New York in the 1870s and '80s, and during a trip to London in 1909. In 1919, after travelling to Japan, China and Korea, he was named Honorary Consul-General of Japan for Toronto.

== Related works ==
The popularity of waterfalls within ukiyo-e design was given a distinct boost by a series of prints dating to around 1832 entitled Shokoku taki meguri (諸国瀧廻り) (A Tour of the Waterfalls of the Provinces) by the master Katsushika Hokusai. Unlike Ryūsai's design, however, the eight prints in the series all feature prominent waterfalls identified by name and belong to the landscape subgenre known as 名所絵 (meisho-e) (pictures of famous sites). Also different is the fact that in Hokusai's scenes the scale and power of the waterfall is typically emphasized by the placement of small human figures within the scene.

== See also ==
- View of Tempōzan Park in Naniwa (Gochōtei Sadamasu) - kamigata-e print in same collection
- Ryūsai Shigeharu
- Actor Arashi Rikan II as Osome (Ryūsai Shigeharu) - print in same collection by same artist
- Bust portrait of Actor Kataoka Ichizō I (Gochōtei Sadamasu II) - kamigata-e print in same collection
- Two Actors in Samurai Roles (Gosotei Hirosada) - kamigata-e print in same collection
