= Kataoka Ichizo =

Kabuki stage name

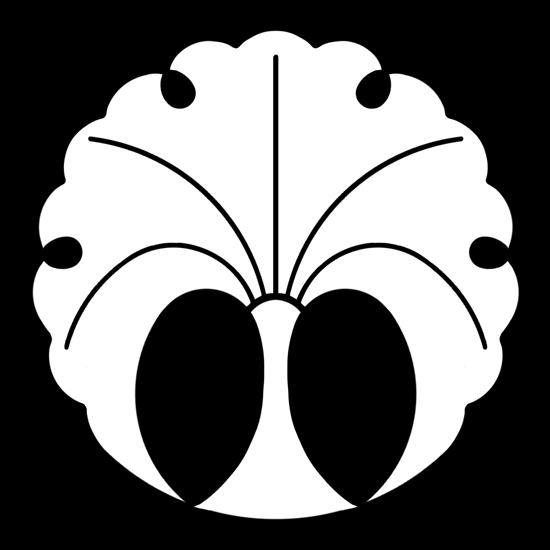
Tachi Ichō no Maru

Kataoka Ichizō is a kabuki stage name which originated in the Osaka theatre, but whose actors are now based in Tokyo. The name has been passed down from the early 19th-century to the present day through six generations. The jōmon (定紋) family crest used to represent the line is the ichō no maru (銀杏丸) inverted ginkgo leaf design.

== Kataoka Ichizō I ==
=== Biography ===
Kataoka Ichizō I (片岡市蔵) was born Fujikawa Shōzaburō (藤川鐘三郎) in 1792, the son of a low-ranking kabuki actor who gave him his initial training. In 1810 he began an apprenticeship under respected actor Kataoka Nizaemon VII (片岡仁左衛門), and took the name Kataoka Ichizō I. He began his career by performing in minor Osaka area hamashibai (浜芝居) theatres and on stages erected within shrine grounds. In 1820, he became attached to Osaka's Ōnishi (大西) theatre. He also travelled throughout Japan, performing in Edo, Kyoto, Nagoya and Ise. He took actors Kataoka Ichizō II and Kataoka Ichōmaru under his wing as disciples. His large build and loud voice were well suited to the katakiyaku (敵役) and jitsuaku (実悪) villain roles in which he specialized. He was so admired for these performances that he earned the nickname "Jitsuaku no oyadama" (実悪の親玉): King of the Villains. He was, however, also credited with the ability to deliver subtle sewamono (世話物) dramatic performances, particularly in fukeyaku (老役) elderly man roles. Ichizō I held the name from 1810 to 1858 when he took the name Takekawa Ichizō (竹川市蔵). From 1860 to the spring of 1862, Ichizō took a break from performing due to eye problems and encroaching senility. In the 5th lunar month of 1862 he appeared on stage for the last time in the play "Ōmi Genji Senjin Yakata." He died in the 7th lunar month of 1862.

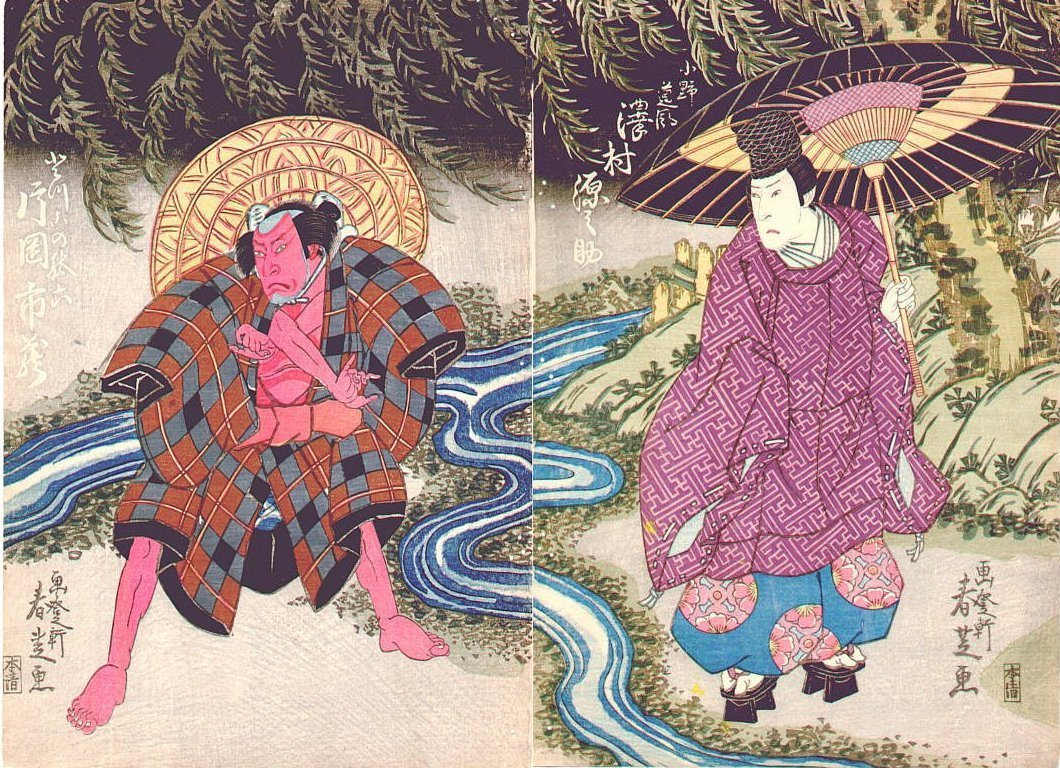
Gatōken Shunshi - (diptych) Sawamura Gennosuke II as Ono no Tofu (R) & Kataoka Ichizō I as Yakko no Daroku (L) in Ono no Tofu Aoyagi Suzuri

=== Names ===
Ichizō I was associated with a number of names throughout his life, as per kabuki convention:

- Stage names: Takekawa Ichizō (竹川市蔵) (1858), Kataoka Ichizō I (片岡市蔵) (1810-1862), Fujikawa Kanezō, Fujikawa Kanesaburō
- Nickname: Kata Ichi (片市)
- Haimyō (俳名): Gajō (我丈), Gashō (我升)
- Yagō (屋号) guild names: Takekawaya (竹川屋), Tenmaya (天満屋), Matsushimaya (松島屋)

=== Artworks ===
Kataoka Ichizō I appears in prints by the following artists:

- Sadamasu
- Toshikuni
- Utagawa Kunikazu
- Kunisada
- Konishi Hirosada

== Kataoka Ichizō II ==
=== Biography ===
Very little is known of Ichizō II's personal details, including the dates of his birth and death. He began his career with the Kataoka family as a disciple of Ichizō I, but went on to study with the Nakamura clan under Nakamura Utaemon IV. His speciality was supporting katakiyaku villain roles. After spending some time in the late 1850s performing in Edo to great acclaim, he returned to Osaka where he rejoined the Kataoka family. He took the name Kataoka Ichizō II (2代目片岡市蔵) early in 1865, almost three years after the death of his predecessor. His name ceased appearing on kabuki playbills in the last years of the Edo period.

=== Names ===
Ichizō II was associated with the following names throughout his career:

- Stage names: Kataoka Takizō, Nakamura Hangorō, Nakamura Kajaku (1857-1860), Kataoka Jūzō (1860-1865), Kataoka Ichizō (1865-)
- Haimyō: Kajaku, Roen
- Yagō: Yamagataya

== Kataoka Ichizō III ==
=== Biography ===
Kataoka Ichizō III (3代目片岡市蔵) was born in 1851 in the Osaka-area town of Soemon (宗右衛門町). His father was artist Kameya Kichibe (亀屋吉兵衛), and his two older brothers were kabuki actors Mimasu Inemaru (三桝稲丸) and Kataoka Gadō II (2代目片岡我當). His first professional appearance was on an Osaka stage in 1855. He was known for his wide-ranging skills, and particularly his portrayal of katakiyaku villains and fukeyaku elderly men. Following the sudden death of his brother, Inemaru, Ichizō III was forced to give up kabuki and begin an apprenticeship in the trades. He returned to the stage, however, becoming a disciple of Kataoka Nizaemon VIII in 1886. In 1887, he became Ichizō III, a title he held until his death in December, 1906.

=== Names ===
- Personal name: Naojiro (直次郎)
- Stage names: Mimasu Kamezō (三枡亀蔵) (1855), Kataoka Chōjūro VI (6代目片岡蝶十郎) (c. 1869), Kataoka Gakuzaburo (片岡我久三郎) (1886), Kataoka Ichizō III (1887)
- Haimyō: Gashō (我升)
- Yagō: Matsushimaya (松島屋), Kataichi (片市)

== Kataoka Ichizō IV ==
=== Biography ===
Kataoka Ichizō IV (4代目片岡市蔵) was born in the Shitaya district of Tokyo in 1880. Later he was adopted by Ichizō III, who trained him until his debut at Tokyo's Nakamura-za theatre in 1887. He continued to perform until 1904 when the outbreak of the Russo-Japanese War resulted in his being sent to the front. In 1906, he was discharged from the military. The general euphoria over Japan's military victory carried over to the theatre, where houses were frequently packed. In 1909, almost 3 full years after the death of his adoptive father, he succeeded to the Ichizō line. He went on to hold this title until his death in 1926, meaning that his career spanned the Meiji and Taishō periods. Ichizō IV was noted for his loud voice and large personality, which made him well-suited to strong leading roles. He was praised in particular for his onnagata (女形) female roles, as well as his shosagoto (所作事) and buyō (舞踊) dance performances.

=== Names ===
- Personal name: Kataoka Ryūnosuke (片岡竜之助)
- Stage names: Kataoka Kamezō III (三代目片岡亀蔵) (1887-1904), Kataoka Jūzō IV (四代目片岡十蔵) (1904-1909), Kataoka Ichizō IV (1909-1926)
- Haimyō: Gashō
- Yagō: Matsushimaya

=== Artwork ===
- Natori Shunsen

== Kataoka Ichizō V ==
=== Biography ===
Born in Tokyo on February 10, 1916, Ichizō V (五代目片岡市蔵) was the eldest son of Ichizō IV. He first appeared on the kabuki stage in January 1922 at Tokyo's Shintomi-za (新富座) theatre in the role of a child. He became head of the Kataoka Ichizō line in October 1934. After the war, he joined the troupe of Matsumoto Kōshirō VII (七代目松本幸四郎). After Matsumoto's death, he became a disciple of Ichikawa Danjūrō XI (十一代目市川團十郎). On June 30, 1991, aged 75, Ichizō fell from the platform at Tokyo's Yushima subway station and died.

Ichizō V was known for his performance of supporting roles. His two sons followed in his steps as kabuki actors, the eldest becoming Kataoka Ichizō VI (六代目片岡市蔵), and the youngest becoming Kataoka Kamezō IV (四代目片岡亀蔵). His daughter married rakugo (落語) performer Shunpūtei Itchōno (春風亭一朝).

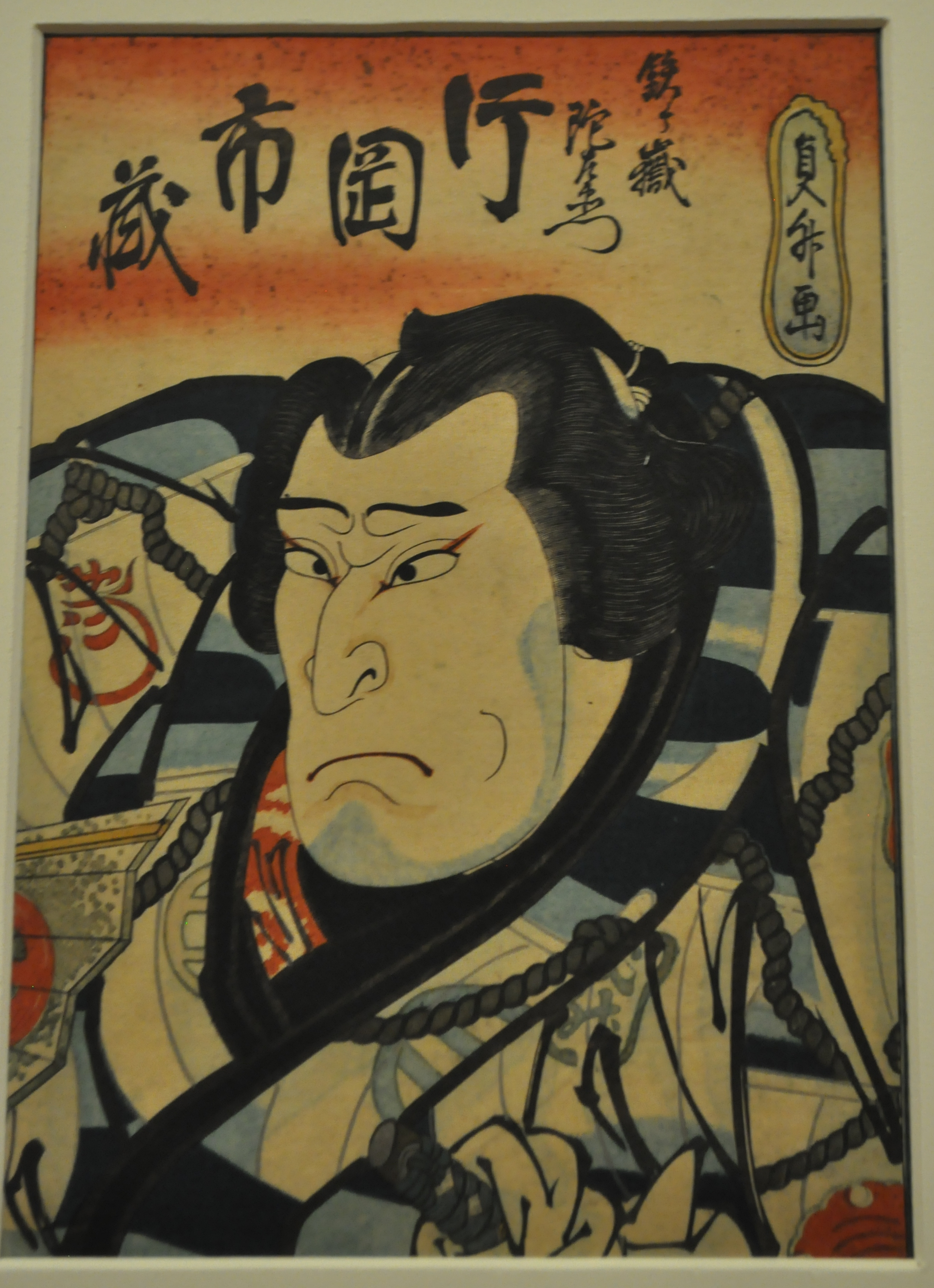
Sadamasu - Portrait of Kataoka Ichizō I in ROM

=== Names ===
- Personal name: Kataoka Tarō (片岡太郎)
- Stage names: Kataoka Ichizō V (1934-1991)
- Haimyō: Gashō (我升)
- Yagō: Matsushimaya

=== Signature roles ===
- Kitamura Daizen (北村大膳) in Kumo ni Magō Ueno no Hatsuhana (天衣紛上野初花)
- Kajiwara Kagetaka (梶原景高) in Ichi no Tani Futaba Gunki (一谷嫩軍記)
- Sagizaka Bannai (鷺坂伴内) in Kanadehon Chūshigura (仮名手本忠臣蔵)

== Kataoka Ichizō VI ==
=== Biography ===
Kataoka Ichizō VI (六代目片岡市蔵), born in Tokyo on December 12, 1958, is the oldest son of Ichizō V. He has held the rank of principal actor since 1985, and held the Ichizō VI title since May, 2003. He is a member of the Organization for the Preservation of Kabuki (伝統歌舞伎保存会). He has performed internationally, including appearing at the Paris Opera. He currently has as his disciple his younger brother, Kataoka Kamezō IV (四代目片岡亀蔵).

=== Names ===
- Personal Name: Kataoka Kōichi (片岡幸一)
- Stage names: Kataoka Kōichi (1962-1969), Kataoka Jūzō (六代目片岡十蔵) (1969-2003), Kataoka Ichizō VI (六代目片岡市蔵) (2003- )
- Haimyō: Gashō
- Yagō: Matsushimaya

=== Signature roles ===
- Kunizamurai Rikinta (国侍利金太) in Sukeroku Yukari no Edo Zakura (助六由縁江戸桜)
- Kōmori Yasu (蝙蝠安) in Yowa Nasake Ukina no Yokogushi (与話情浮名横櫛)

=== Awards ===
- 1972: National Theatre Award Encouragement Prize [国立劇場奨励賞]
- 1983: National Theatre Award Encouragement Prize [国立劇場奨励賞]
- 1989: Kansai Kabuki Preservation Association Award Encouragement Prize [関西で歌舞伎を育てる会奨励賞]
- 1990: Mayama Seika Award for Best Supporting Actor [眞山青果賞助演賞]
- 1993: National Theatre Award Encouragement Prize [国立劇場奨励賞]
- 1995: 1st Annual Japan Actors' Association Encouragement Prize [第一回日本俳優協会賞奨励賞]
- 1997: Kabuki-za Prize [歌舞伎座賞]
- 2009: National Theatre Award of Excellence [国立劇場優秀賞]
- 2010: National Theatre Encouragement Prize [国立劇場奨励賞]

== See also ==
- Bust portrait of Actor Kataoka Ichizō I (Gochōtei Sadamasu II)
- Utagawa Kunimasu

== External sources ==
- http://www.kataichi.com/ - Official website of Kataoka Ichizō (in Japanese)
- http://www.kabuki-bito.jp/eng/top.html - Official website of Shochiku Kabuki
