= Hirosada II =

Designer

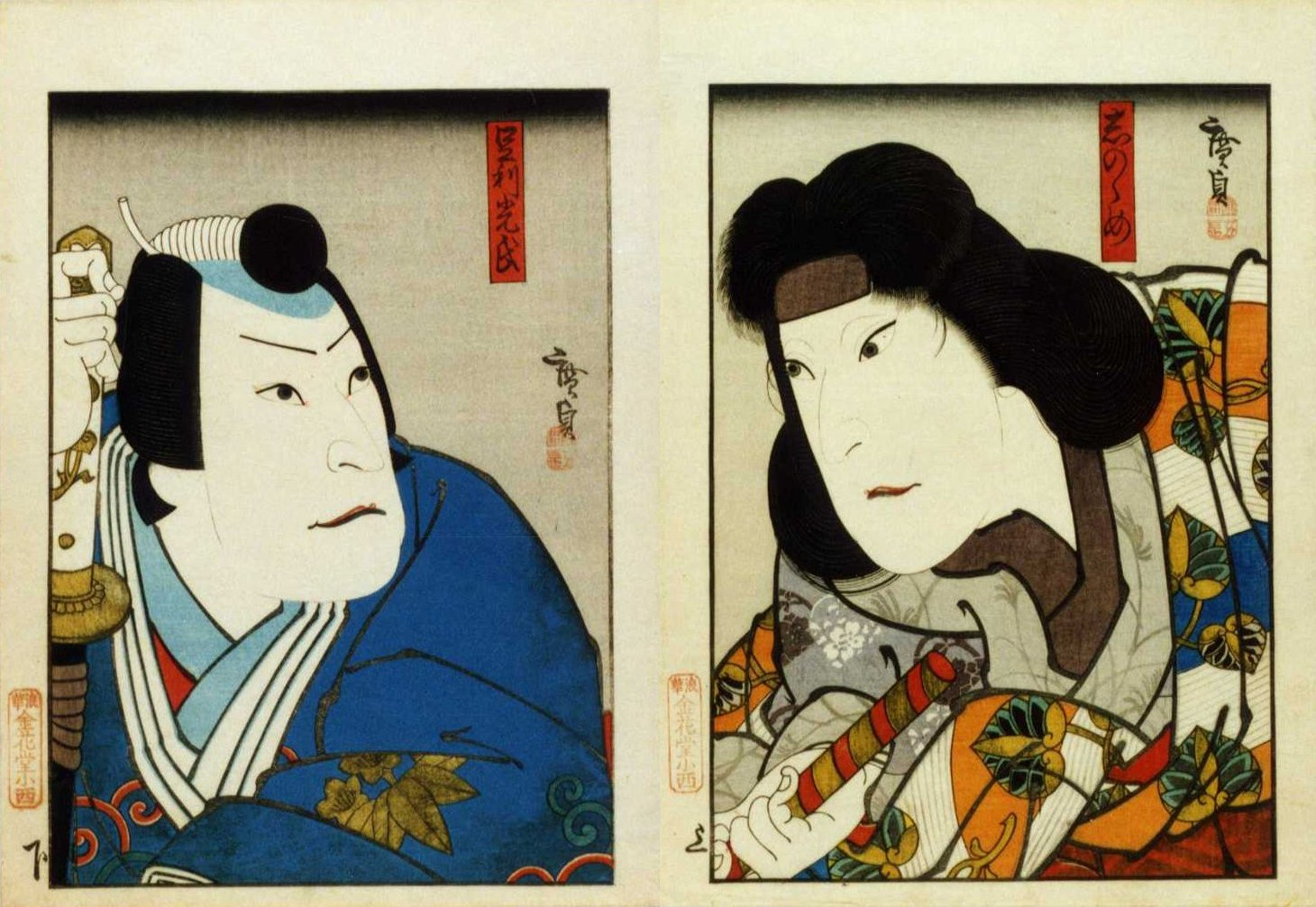
Woodblock diptych by Hirosada II of kabuki actors Jitsukawa Enzaburô I (left) and Mimasu Daigorô IV (right), 1853

Hirosada II, also known as Sadahiro II, was a designer of ukiyo-e Japanese woodblock prints in Osaka. He was a student of Konishi Hirosada, and assumed the name “Hirosada” in 1853, when his teacher ceased designing prints. In the summer of 1864, Hirosada I died and his student changed his name, for a second time, from “Hirosada” (廣貞) to “Sadahiro” (貞廣).

== Signature ==
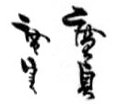
Signatures of Hirosada I (left) and Hirosada II (right), both reading “Hirosada” (廣貞)

Whereas the signature of Hirosada I is compact, Hirosada II signed his name in a large bold hand.
