= Arashi Rikan II =

Kabuki actor (1788–1837)

- 嵐 璃寛
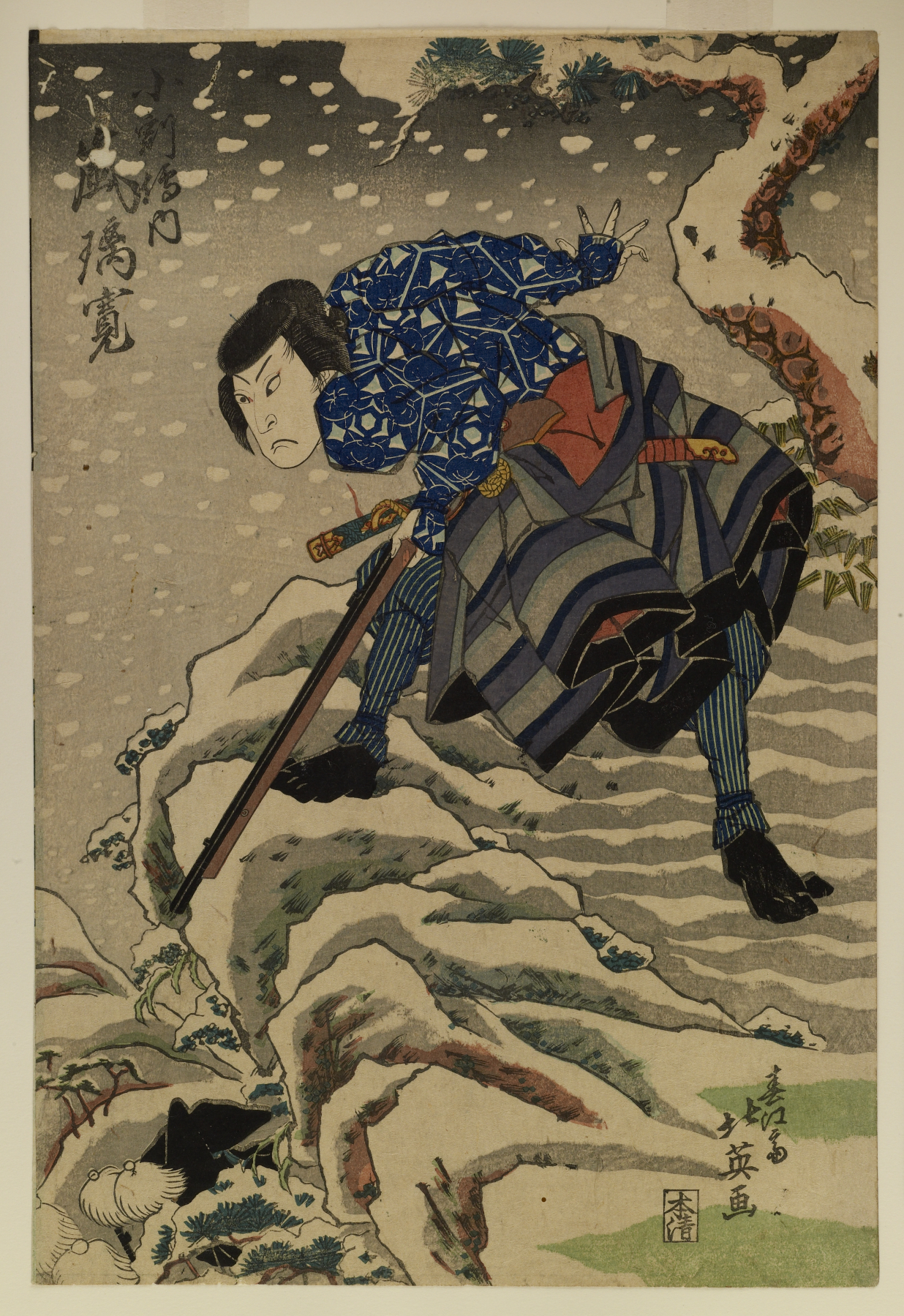
- Arashi Rikan II as the hunter Kowari Dennai (小割 伝内), c. 1828-1837

Personal details
- Born: 1788 Osaka, Kawachi Province, Japan
- Died: July 15, 1837 (aged 48–49) Osaka, Kawachi Province, Japan

Arashi Rikan II (二代目 嵐 璃寛; 1788–1837) was a Japanese kabuki actor of the late Edo period. He specialized in male roles (立役, tachiyaku), but sometimes also performed as an onnagata.

== Biography ==
In 1800, Arashi appeared on stage for the first time in Osaka where he received the name of Arashi Tokusaburō II (二代目 嵐 徳三郎).

He spent the first two decades of his career on the stages of minor theatres across the Kamigata region. He took the name Rikan II in 1828.

Small in stature, Rikan II was famous for his striking eyes. He was given the moniker Metoku (目徳; transl. Toku of the Eyes), from the characters moku (目; lit. 'eye') and the toku (徳) of his original stage name Tokusaburō.

He was the particular favourite of artist Shunbaisai Hokuei (fl. 1824-1837) and appears in most of his prints.

He performed until his death in 1837, and was buried in Osaka. Nakamura Utaemon IV attended his funeral. The Arashi Rikan line continued into the fifth generation, dying out in 1920.

== Gallery ==
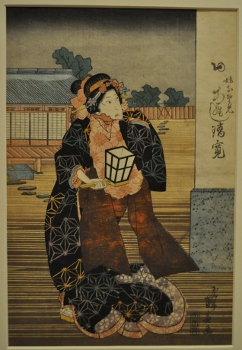
Arashi Rikan II as Osome

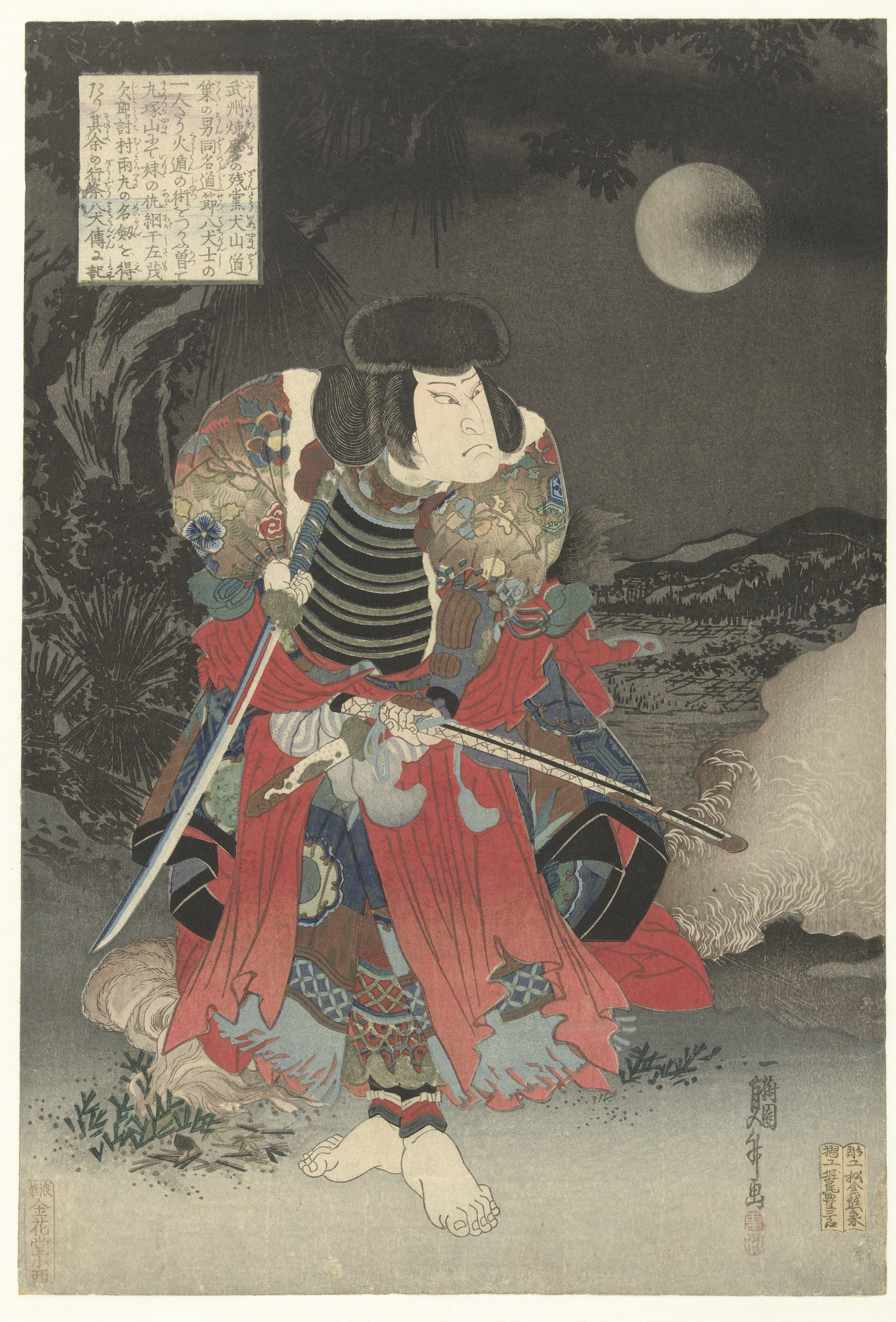
Arashi Rikan II as Inuyama Dōsetsu (犬山 道節) from the Hakkenden

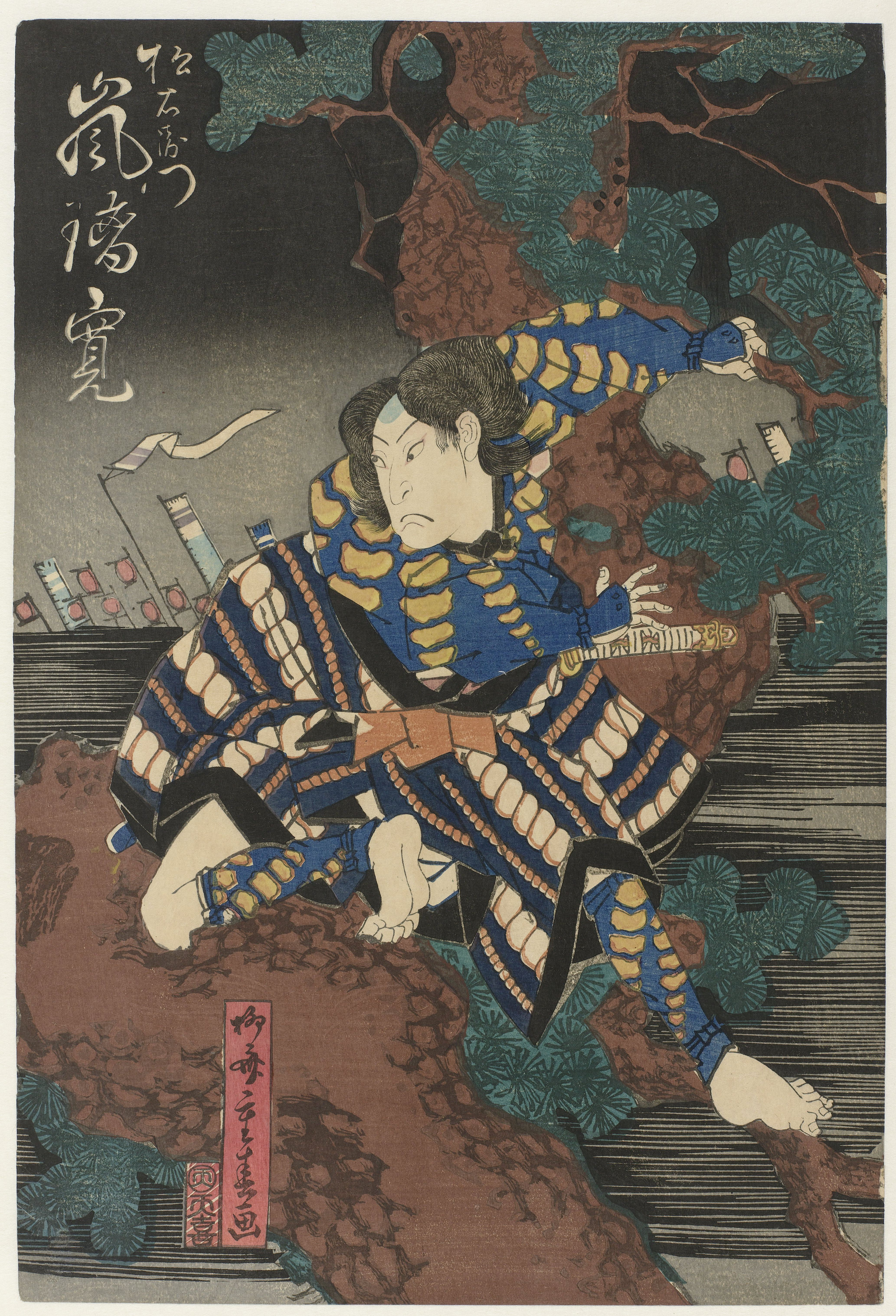
Arashi Rikan II as Higuchi Kanemitsu (d. 1184), a retainer of Kiso Yoshinaka
