= Konishi Hirosada =

19th-century Osaka-based woodblock print designer

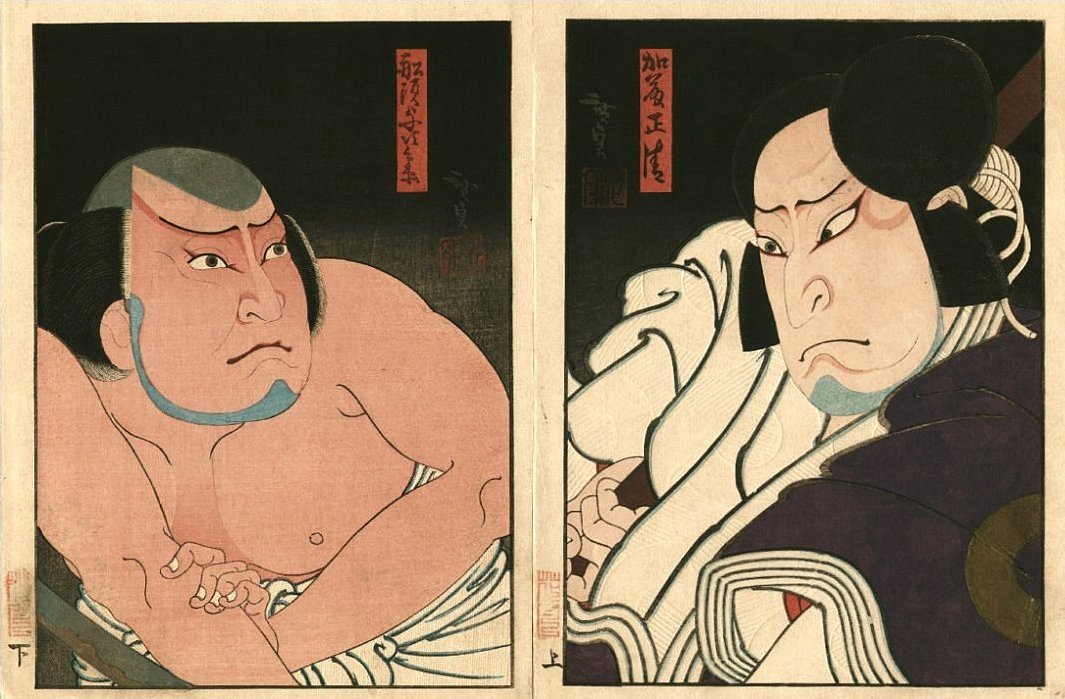
diptych by Hirosada I showing actors Nakamura Utaemon IV (right) and Nakamura Tomosa II (left) in the play Keisei Kiyome no Funauta (1/1851)

Konishi Hirosada (小西 廣貞) (fl. c. 1819–1863) was the most prolific Osaka-based designer of ukiyo-e woodblock prints during the late Edo period. Like most producers of kamigata-e (上方絵)—prints originating in the Osaka and Kyoto regions—he specialized in yakusha-e actor prints. Hirosada is particularly known for his diptychs and triptychs, and for his many ōkubi-e portraits of the leading actors on the Osaka kabuki stage during his day.

== Biography ==
Although Hirosada has been acknowledged as "the most important and prolific mid-nineteenth century Osaka designer," little is known about his personal life. Those biographies which refer to his life dates identify his birth year as unknown and the year of his death as 1864 or 1865. Art historians link his activity to between 1810 and 1865. He is believed to have apprenticed with prominent Osaka artist Utagawa Kunimasu (歌川国升), and to have studied alongside Kunimasu in Edo in the early 1830s under Utagawa Kunisada (歌川国貞).

Following the relaxation of the Tempō Reforms in 1847, Hirosada became a major designer of medium-sized chūban prints, the format championed by his mentor Kunimasu. He was highly prolific, working mainly in the kabuki-e and yakusha-e genres. He is particularly known for his many ōkubi-e (lit. "large head") portraits of the leading actors on the Osaka kabuki stage, which he began to produce in 1841. As a testament to his productivity, Gerstle notes, "In the period up to 1852 Hirosada designed approximately 800 single-sheet prints, making him the most prolific of the Osaka print artists by far and unquestionably a 'professional'."

Hirosada produced designs for a number of Osaka-based publishing houses including Kitakagawa, Kyoisa, Isakichi, Kawato, Tenki and Meikōdō. Among his students were the artists Hironobu (広信), Sadayuki (貞幸) and Sadahiro II (貞廣二代). The latter succeeded Hirosada as both Sadahiro II and Hirosada II.

== Names ==
In keeping with the custom for Edo period artists, Hirosada used a number of different gō art names throughout his career, including Gosōtei Hirosada (五粽亭廣貞), Gorakutei Hirosada (五楽亭廣貞) and Utagawa Hirosada (歌川廣貞). Born Kyōmaruya Seijirō, he apparently began his artistic career as Hirokuni (廣國/ 広国), switching to Hirosada in mid-1847. He is associated with various artist seals including Gochō, Sada, Kō, Chō, Sadahiro and Gosōtei. Some scholars have linked Hirosada's name changes with an intent to evade censorship; however, it was not uncommon for artists of the period to adapt or adopt new names on a whim.

In addition to these recognized names, some scholars have suggested that Hirosada and his contemporary Osaka artist Utagawa Sadahiro (歌川貞廣) (fl. 1830–1847) were one and the same. According to Keyes, "there is a strong, though unproven case for believing that Gosōtei Hirosada... was the well-known artist Sadahiro I." Evidence for this, Keyes argues, can be found in stylistic similarities between the two artists' work, the similarity of the artists' names (the same two characters reversed—廣 [hiro] + 貞 [sada] vs 貞 [sada] + 廣 [hiro]) and signatures, the two artists' use of the same 'Gosōtei' gō, and the appearance of the 'Sadahiro' seal on some prints signed by Hirosada.

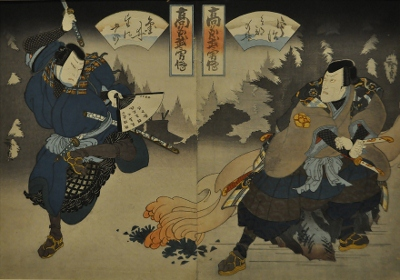
diptych from the series "Tales of Brave Warriors of Renown" showing Ichikawa Ebizō V (left) and Arashi Rikan III(right) in the play Go Taiheiki Shiroishi Banashi (8/1848)

== Reputation & style ==
Art historians are quick to acknowledge Hirosada's stature and influence: he was "the most important—and prolific—Osaka print designer of the post-Tenpô period," "the central figure of mid-nineteenth century Osaka printmaking," and "one of the finest portraitists of the nineteenth century." In the 1840s and 1850s he produced over eight-hundred single-sheet prints, "outnumbering by far" the output of any of his contemporaries. His prints are "among the finest and most individual of the whole ukiyo-e genre," and "among some of the finest character portraits produced anywhere in the world."

In terms of format, the majority of his works from 1847 and later are medium-sized chūban rather than the previously dominant larger ōban size. He produced kabuki-e almost exclusively, and was particularly celebrated for his polytychs—mainly diptychs and triptychs—and ōkubi-e actor portraits. Stylistically his polytychs are noted for "imaginative placements, unusual cropping of figures and descriptive physiognomies," and the "subtle but inventive interplay among the figures."

Hirosada has been credited with an "instantly recognisable," "insightful," "exceptionally expressive and dramatic" style. Critics have praised the "clarity and self-assurance" of his drawing, and his simple, sophisticated style which avoids "flashy" enhancements. As Keyes notes, "Hirosada’s prints are an exploration of the depth and meaning of human relationships. They are intimate and direct. Other Japanese artists had portrayed the timeless, fragile and unchanging aspects of human life. Hirosada celebrated the separate, unrepeatable, unique, human event."

== Collections ==
- The Austrian Museum of Applied Arts
- The Museum of Fine Arts Boston
- The British Museum
- The Philadelphia Museum of Art
- The Royal Ontario Museum
- The Honolulu Museum of Art
- The Art Gallery of Greater Victoria
- The Pushkin State Museum
- The Rijksmuseum
- The Fitzwilliam Museum
- The Metropolitan Museum of Art
- The Tsubouchi Memorial Theatre Museum of Waseda University
- The Udinotti Museum of Figurative Art
- The Victoria & Albert Museum
- The State Hermitage Museum

== See also ==
- Two Actors in Samurai Roles (Gosotei Hirosada)
- Actor Ichikawa Shiko as Kato Yomoshichi (Gosotei Hirosada)
- Ryūsai Shigeharu
