= Shunbaisai Hokuei =

Japanese artist (died 1837)

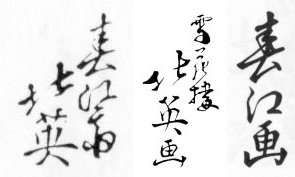
Signatures of Shunbaisai Hokuei reading from left to right: “Shunkōsai Hokuei” (春江斎 北英), “Sekkarō Hokuei ga” (雪花楼 北英 画), and “Shunkō ga” (春江 画)

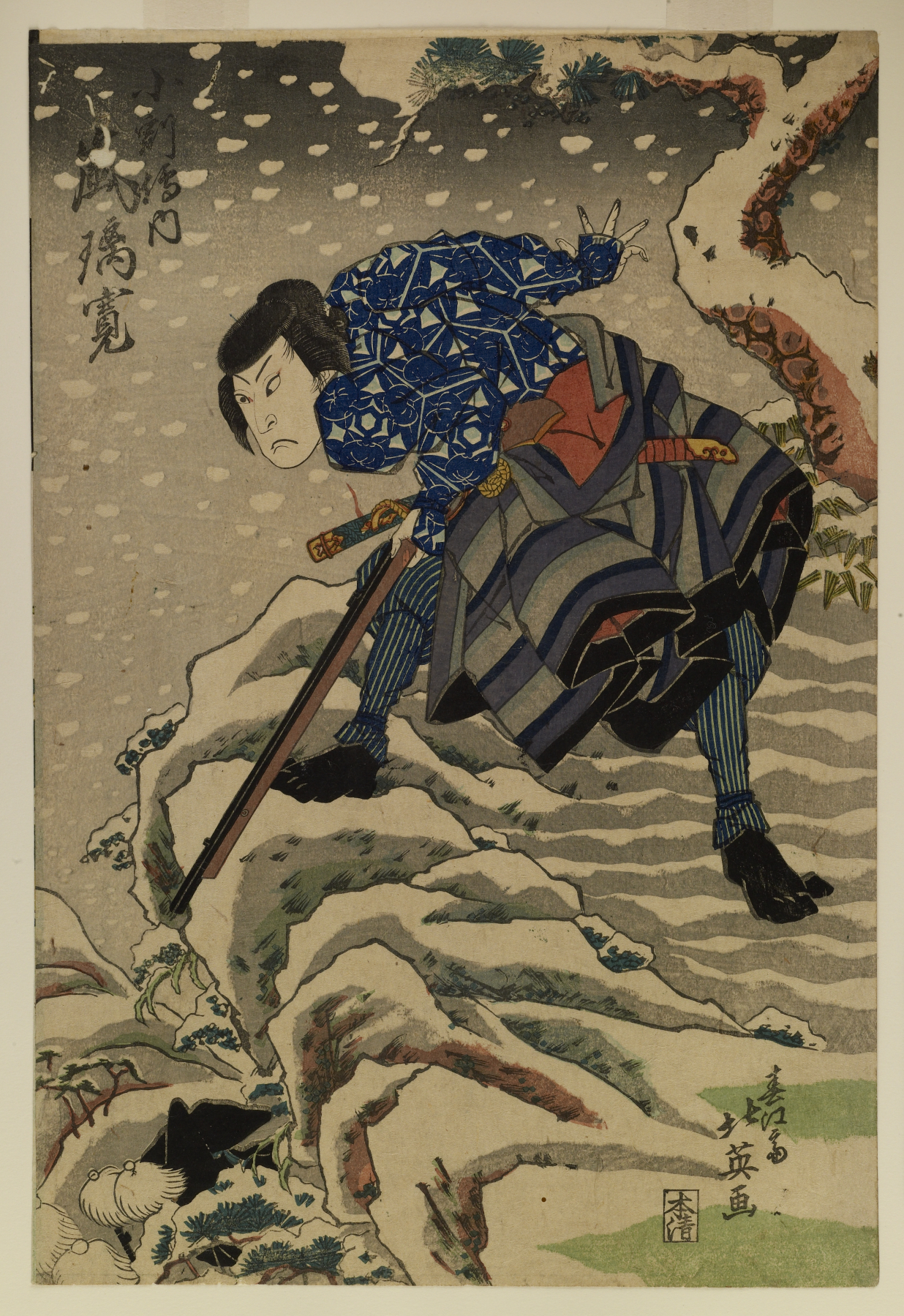
Keisei Ura no Asagin Woodblock print by Shunkôsai Hokuei. The play "Keisei Ura no Asagin" describes an unsuccessful attempt by a villain named Karahashi, a subject of the Aboshi clan, to steal the clan treasures and install his son as leader. In act 3, Kowari Dennai, a hunter who is a relative of the true heir, is traveling to the Aboshi domains to settle the succession. Arashi Rikan II plays Kowari Dennai.

Shunbaisai Hokuei (Japanese: 春梅斎 北英; d. 1837), also known as Shunkō III, was a designer of ukiyo-e style Japanese woodblock prints in Osaka, and was active from about 1824 to 1837. He was a student of Shunkōsai Hokushū. Hokuei’s prints most often portray the kabuki actor Arashi Rikan II.

Hokuei's first collaboration with the talented engraver Yama Kasuke, who had already worked for Hokuei's own teacher Shunkōsai Hokushū (and had himself studied under him), was a deluxe ōban print showing Arashi Rikan II in a magnificent crane-decorated robe, standing within a whirlwind he had conjured, his hands positioned in a sorcerer's gesture as he used magical powers to control the elements. Hokuei's first ōkubi-e, published at the start of what would become his most productive year, was a deluxe double portrait of Nakamura Utaemon III as Kumagai no Jirō Naozane and Arashi Rikan II as Taira no Atsumori in Suma no Miyako Genpei Tsutsuji, staged at Osaka's Kado Theatre in the second month of 1832, an adaptation of tales from the Genpei War (1156–1185). Hokuei died in 1837; his pupils included Shun'yūsai Hokuhō (active around 1830), Shunshōsai Hokuju (active 1828–1836, also known by the gō Shun'eisai Hokuju and Gōryūken) and Shunshōsai Hokujun.

Shunbaisai Hokuei should not be confused with Tōkōen Hokuei (桃幸園 北英), an early 19th-century Edo (Tokyo) printmaker who is also commonly referred to as "Hokuei".
