= Waseda University Tsubouchi Memorial Theatre Museum =

Coordinates: 35°42′36″N 139°43′10″E

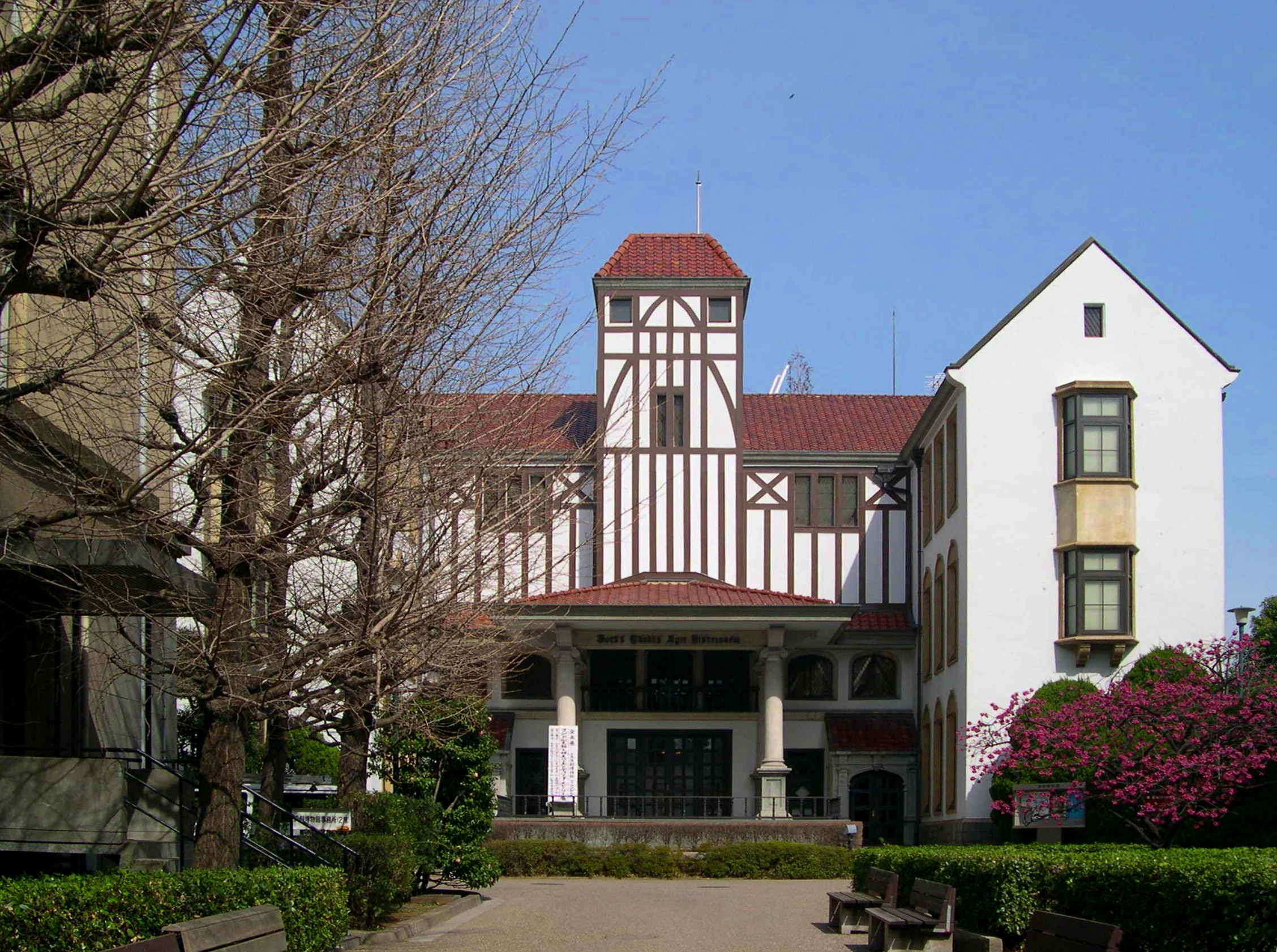
Tsubouchi Memorial Theatre Museum, also known as Enpaku

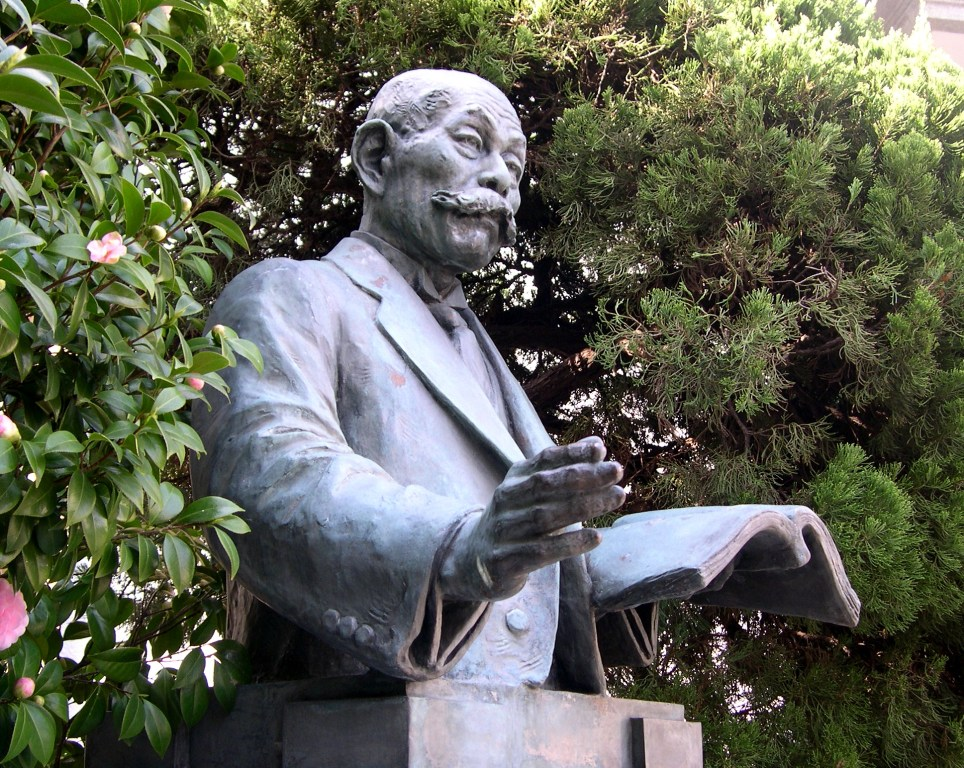
Bust of Tsubouchi Shōyō at the museum, which was named in his honour

Map

The Tsubouchi Memorial Theatre Museum of Waseda University is a university museum devoted to the history of drama, with facilities used for cultural performances from all over the world. The museum was named for Tsubouchi Shōyō, a famous writer known for his work with theater and translation of the collected works of Shakespeare into Japanese. It is commonly known as Enpaku in Japanese.

== History ==
The Waseda Theatre Museum formally opened in 1928, following the dreams of Professor Tsubouchi to build a museum dedicated to theatre arts. It commemorates all of Tsubouchi's accomplishments, among them a 40-volume translation of the works of Shakespeare that Tsubouchi also finished in 1928, the year of his 70th birthday. Modelled after the Fortune Theatre of London, the museum approximates its inspiration in both exterior construction and interior design.

== Collections ==
The Waseda Theatre Museum functions as both a repository and exhibition space, housing nearly 37,000 items and 100,000 volumes. For example it has a large number of ukiyo-e prints depicting the popular kabuki play Chūshingura.
