= Utagawa Kunimasu =

Japanese ukiyo-e designer

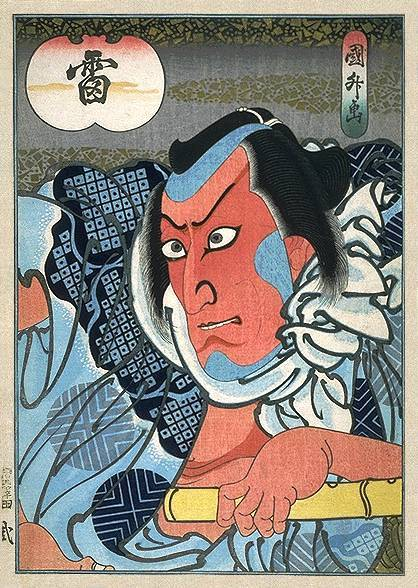
Woodblock print by Utagawa Kunimasu of actor Ichikawa Ebizō V as Kaminari in the kabuki play Otokodate Itsutsu Karigane, 1850

Utagawa Kunimasu (歌川 国升) was a designer of ukiyo-e woodblock prints in Osaka who was active during the late Edo period. He was a leading producer of kamigata-e, prints from the Osaka and Kyoto areas. He is also known as Sadamasu [貞升], the artist name he used prior to Kunimasu.

== Biography ==
Very little is known of Kunimasu's personal details, including his birth and death dates. Art historians tend to date his activity to the early 1830s through the early 1850s. An 1835 'Who's who' type catalogue from the Naniwa area of Osaka describes him as "a master" of ukiyo-e, indicating that he was already a well-established artist by the early 1830s. Other manuscripts from the mid-1840s list him as living in the Senba [船場] district of Osaka. In 1899, a brief biography by Meiji-era historian Sekine Shisei (1868–1912) was included in a compendium of biographies. According to Sekine, Kunimasu was a moneyed property owner who studied print design under Utagawa Kunisada in Edo before himself mentoring several pupils and opening his own print design school. Others have suggested that the artist was born into wealth and owned a shipbuilding company. What is certain is that he enjoyed considerable financial freedom and used it to promote ukiyo-e and its producers within Osaka.

== Names ==
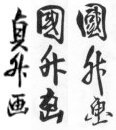
Signatures of Utagawa Kunimasu reading “Sadamasu ga” (貞升 画 left) and “Kunimasu ga” (国升 画 center & right)

As per convention, the artist was known by a number of names throughout his career:

- Artist names: Sadamasu [貞升] (1832–1848), Kunimasu [國升 (occasionally 國益)] (5/1848- )
- Personal name: Kaneya/ Kanaya Wasaburō [金屋 和三郎]
- Studio Name: Kanaya/ Kaneya [金屋]
- Gō: Gochōsai [五蝶斎], Gochōtei [五蝶亭], Gofukutei [五蝠亭], Ichiensai [一園斎], Ichijuen [一樹園], Ichijusai [一樹斎], Ichijutei [一樹亭], Yukimasu [行升]
- Art surname: Utagawa [歌川]
- Seals: Hatakumi, Sada, Sadamasu, Utagawa, Utagawa Kunimasu, Wasa

In 1846 or earlier, he began signing prints as Kunimasu in homage to Kunisada who had taken the name Toyokuni in 1844. The name change could not, however, be made official until 1848 and the lifting of the Tenpō Reforms.

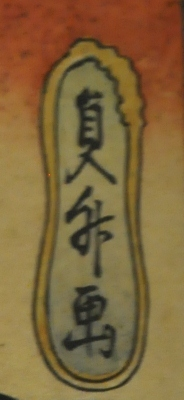
"Sadamasu ga" inside Utagawa toshidama-in cartouche. From print in the Royal Ontario Museum

== Seals ==
In addition to the name seals listed above, Kunimasu used three symbol seals: a bat-shaped seal, the symbol 寿 [ju - longevity], and the toshidama-in cartouche. The latter distinctive mark was reserved for members of the Utagawa school of print designers. Examples of other seals applied to Kunimasu's prints exist, but are indecipherable.

== Work ==
Kunimasu's earliest known print is a banzuke theatre playbill dating to early 1830. Signed "eshi Utagawa Sadamasu ga" [絵師 歌川 貞升 画], the print was almost certainly produced while he was in Edo studying under Utagawa Kunisada. Kunimasu has been described as an "influential" figure on the Osaka art scene, one of his greatest achievements being the popularization of the chūban format. Kunimasu began experimenting with close-up actor portraits in this size in 1840, not long before the Tenpō Reforms were to disrupt yakusha-e production. He encouraged his student and fellow pupil of Kunisada, Hirosada, to follow suit. With the repeal of the Tenpō Reforms in the spring of 1847, Hirosada was to pioneer a revival of the chūban portrait format, likely through the financial support of Kunimasu.

Critics tend to admire Kunimasu's "sense of colour and... fine palette dominated by intense colours with subtle contrasts," as well as the "bold directness" of his lines. In addition, he is credited with employing "tour-de-force techniques" such as "sumptuously printed... metallic pigments, embossing, burnishing, [and] overprinting."

The majority of Kunimasu's works belong to the yakusha-e genre, being portraits of actors from the local kabuki theatre world. This is a common feature of artists from the Kamigata region, where the vast majority of artists were not professionals, but "talented kabuki fans." Kunimasu in particular is credited with "expressing the psychology of stage performance through powerful and varied physiognomies and vivid or unusual placements of the figures in his compositions."

In 1852, Kunimasu and his student Hirosada visited Edo, where they joined with other pupils of Kunisada in creating background designs for a series of half-length actor portraits. Soon after returning to Kamigata, Kunimasu turned his back on ukiyo-e and took up painting. He ended his artistic career producing paintings in the style of the Shijō school, known for its blending of Japanese tradition with Western realism.

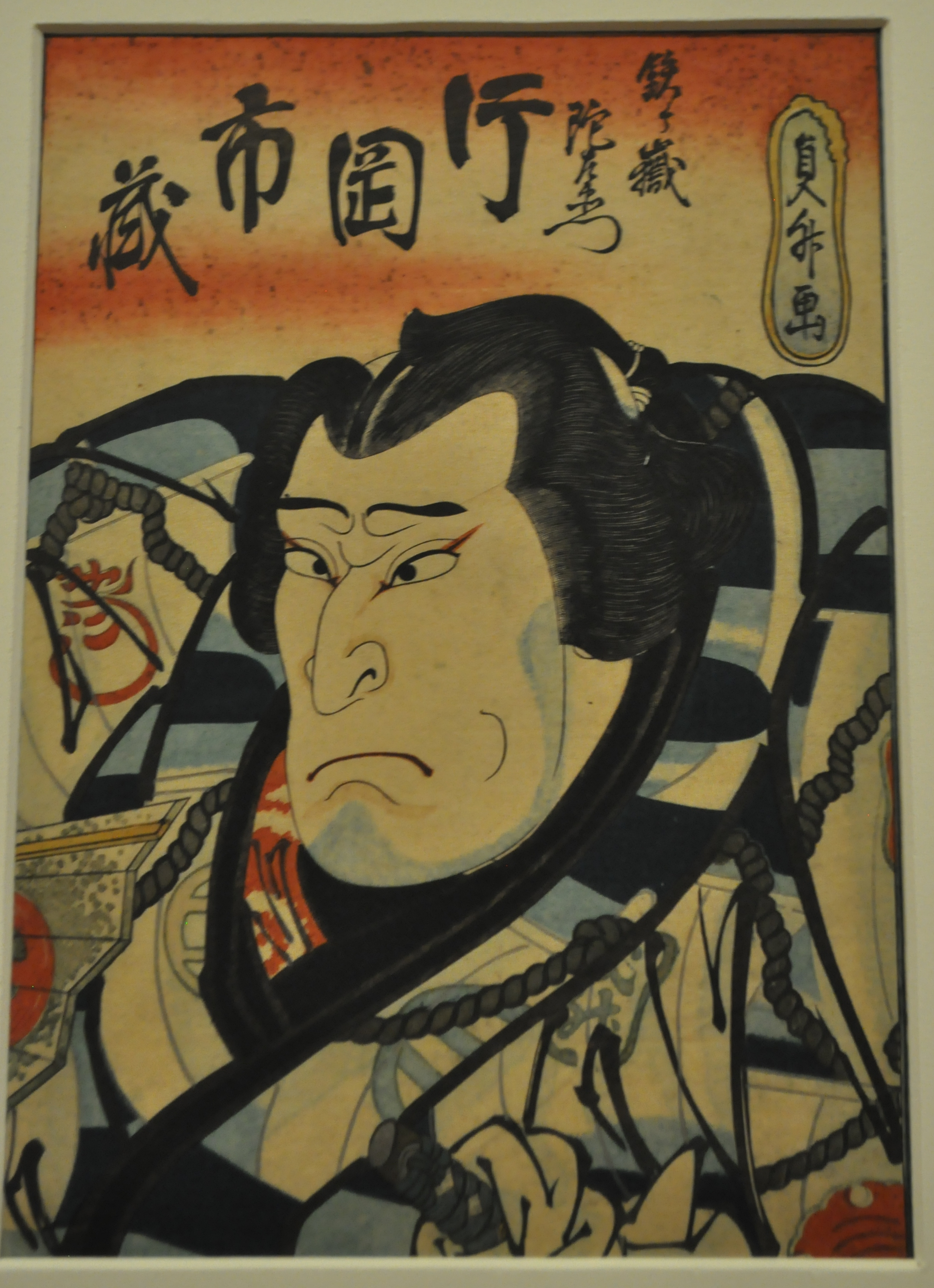
Portrait of Kataoka Ichizō I by Sadamasu/ Kunimasu. Print in Royal Ontario Museum

== Students ==
Kunimasu is well known to have been an active proponent of Osaka printmaking and to have directly aided the careers of a number of artists. Among those known to have studied under Kunimasu are the following:

- Nobukatsu [信勝] (fl. late 1820s–late 1830s)
- Sadayuki [貞雪] (fl. 1839–1840)
- Utagawa Hirosada [歌川 廣貞] (fl. 1835–1850s)
- Masuharu [升春] (fl. 1849–1850)
- Masunobu [升信] (fl. 1847–1851)
- Masusada [升貞] (fl. 1848–1849)
- Sadamasu II [貞升] (fl. 1849)
- Hasegawa Sadanobu [長谷川 貞信] (fl. 1834–1879)

== Collections ==
Works signed by Sadamasu or Kunimasu belong to the following museum collections:

- The Museum of Fine Arts, Boston
- The Royal Ontario Museum
- The Rijksmuseum
- The Pushkin Museum
- The National Gallery of Victoria
- The Fitzwilliam Museum
- The British Museum
- The Fine Arts Museums of San Francisco
- The Metropolitan Museum of Art

== See also ==
- Bust portrait of Actor Kataoka Ichizō I (Gochōtei Sadamasu II)
