= Arashi Rikan II as Osome =

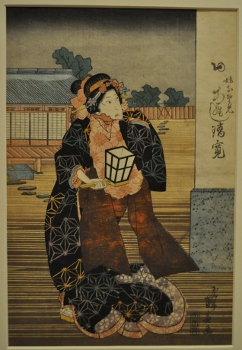
- Arashi Rikan II as Osome by Ryūsai Shigeharu
- Artist: Ryūsai Shigeharu
- Year: 1830
- Type: nishiki-e woodblock print, ink and color on paper
- Condition: on display (November 2013- )
- Location: Royal Ontario Museum; Toronto
- Accession: 974.343.3

Arashi Rikan II as Osome is an ukiyo-e woodblock print by Osaka print artist Ryūsai Shigeharu (柳斎 重春) (1802 – 1853). It depicts late Edo period kabuki actor, Arashi Rikan II as the lead female character in a scene from a popular play of the period. The print belongs to the permanent collection of the Prince Takamado Gallery of Japanese Art in the Royal Ontario Museum, Canada.

== Print details ==
- Medium: kamigata nishiki-e (上方錦絵) woodblock print; ink and colour on paper
- Format: tate-e vertical print
- Genre: kabuki-e, yakusha-e
- Japanese title: Arashi Rikan II as Osome (娘おそめ あらし璃寛)
- Exhibit title: Actor Arashi Rikan II as Osome
- Inscription: none
- Signature: Gyokuryūtei Shigeharu ga (玉柳亭重春画) in bottom right corner
- Publisher's mark: 天喜 (Tenki)
- Publisher's seal: 天 (Tenki)
- Censor seal: none
- Date seal: none
- Credit line: none

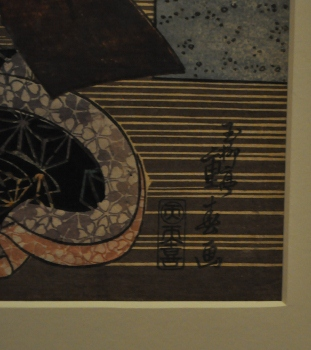
signature & seal

== Artist ==
Ryūsai Shigeharu (柳窗重春/柳斎重春) (1802/3–1853) was born in Nagasaki, Kyushu. He moved to Osaka around 1820, and began studying under Utagawa (Takigawa) Kunihiro (歌川国広) (fl. c.1815-1841), then Yanagawa Shigenobu (柳川重信) (1787–1832). He published his first print in 1820 under the name Nagasaki Kunishige (長崎国重), and used various gō throughout his career. He took the name Ryūsai Shigeharu in 1825. He worked in various media including single-sheet prints, book illustration, theater billboards and programs, and painting. He was active during the period c.1820-1849, and prints signed Kunishige and Shigeharu from 1849 on are likely the work of other artists.

Although contemporary accounts characterize him as "good at everything" and "better than the rest," modern critics have described him as "an indifferent artist". This notwithstanding, Shigeharu was, if not the only professional ukiyo-e artist working in Osaka in the late nineteenth-century, one of the very few on the amateur-dominated art scene.

== Publisher ==
The print displays the publisher's mark associated with Tenki. The seal is a stylized version of the character 天 (ten) contained within a circle. This appears directly above the full characters for Tenki (天喜). Operating under the firm name Kinkadō (金華堂), Tenki, or Tenmaya Kihei (天満屋喜兵衛) as it was also known, was active from 1816 into the 1850s. The Tenki seal version appearing in this print was used from 1826 to 1838.

== Medium and genre ==
Ryūsai Shigeharu spent most, if not all, of his productive years in Osaka, and as such his works are categorized as kamigata-e (上方絵). This term was used to distinguish prints produced in the Kamigata region (Kyoto and Osaka) from those produced in Edo. Gaining prominence about a century after the appearance of ukiyo-e in Edo, kamigata-e belonged mainly to the kabuki-e genre (images of kabuki actors), and were almost entirely the work of non-professional “talented kabuki fans” celebrating their heroes. Shigeharu was a rare exception to this rule.

== Format ==
The image is a vertical tate-e (立絵) ichimai-e (一枚絵) single-sheet print. As the print depicts one half of the romantic duo in a famous love story, and as the signatures, seals and inscriptions are all located on the extreme right of the print, it may have been the right-side half of a diptych.

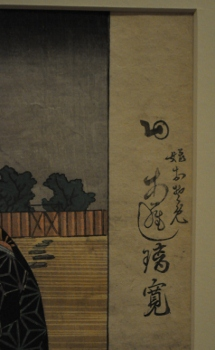
print in collection of ROM, Toronto

== Subject ==
In this print, Arashi Rikan II is depicted as Osome, heroine of Somemoyō Imose no Kadomatsu (染模様妹背門松) (The Love of Osome and Hisamatsu). Originally written for the bunraku (文楽) puppet theatre, it was adapted for the kabuki stage in 1782. It is one of several dramas recounting the tragic true story of two star-crossed lovers who committed double-suicide in 1710, one the daughter of a merchant, the other, her father's apprentice. Osome was a popular subject for yakusha-e artists and often depicted wearing a kimono decorated with hemp flowers.

Rikan II appeared in this role at Osaka's Kado theatre in the ninth lunar month of 1830, and it is likely that this print was completed in celebration of this performance. He reprised the role at the Kitagawa theatre in the eleventh lunar month of 1832, which was memorialized in a print by Shunbaisai Hokuei.

== Description ==
Osome appears in a moment of tension. It is night and she is leaving the grounds of her home. In contrast with the complete darkness of the house behind her, she carries a lit lantern and wears a dark but colourful patterned kimono. Beyond the figure of Osome herself, there is very little detail. The ground is made up of yellow horizontal lines on a brown background, and the sky is coloured with the bokashi technique of colour gradation, darkening from light grey to black as it reaches the top edge of the print. Osome looks up to her left with an uneasy facial expression, her gaze resting somewhere beyond the right border of the print.

== Related works ==
- Museum of Fine Arts, Boston. "Diptych featuring Osome and Hisamatsu, Shigeharu (1830)".
- Ukiyo-e.org. "Arashi Rikan II as Osome, Gigado Ashiyuki (1830)".
- Lyon Collection. "Arashi Rikan II as Osome and Ichikawa Danzō V as Hisamatsu in Somemoyo Imose no Kadomatsu, Shigeharu (1830-1832)".

== See also ==
- View of Tempōzan Park in Naniwa (Gochōtei Sadamasu) - kamigata-e print in same collection
- Ryūsai Shigeharu
- Two Actors in Samurai Roles (Gosotei Hirosada) - kamigata-e print in same collection
