= Ryusai Shigeharu =

Japanese artist (1802–1853)

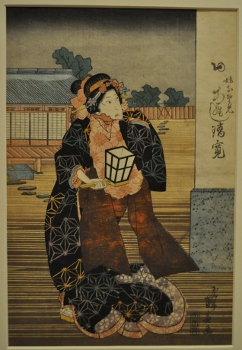
Arashi Rikan II as Osome

Ryūsai Shigeharu (柳窗重春/柳斎重春) (1802–1853) was an Osaka-based Japanese ukiyo-e woodblock print artist active during the first half of the nineteenth century. A member of the Utagawa school, he was one of a very select group of kamigata-e print artists who were able to support themselves solely as professional artists.

== Biography ==
Shigeharu was born Yamaguchi Yasuhide in Hizen Province, Nagasaki in 1802 (year 2 of Kyōwa). His father, Yamaguchi Zenzaemon (山口善右衛門) operated the Ōshima-ya (大島屋) money changing business. He moved to the Mitsudera-machi (三津寺町) district of Osaka around 1820, to study printmaking with his first mentor, Utagawa (Takigawa) Kunihiro (歌川国広) (fl. c.1815-1841). His next teacher was Yanagawa Shigenobu (柳川重信) (1787–1832), with whom he collaborated on several major projects. Some have suggested that Shigeharu also studied under master print designer Hokusai; however, there is no definitive evidence to support this. As was the custom for ukiyo-e artists, Shigeharu used various gō throughout his career. He published his first print in 1820 under the name Nagasaki Kunishige (長崎国重), acknowledging both his birthplace and his first teacher. He adopted the name Ryūsai Shigeharu, which incorporated two characters from his second master's name, in the spring of 1825. In response to political strife during the period, Shigeharu returned to Nagasaki in the early 1840s. He died on May 5, 1852, aged only 51. His daughter, Yonejo, went on to become a painter, whose work was particularly coveted by foreign collectors. There is some dispute over Shigeharu's activity in the final years of his life. Some suggest that he may have returned to Osaka in the late 1840s, and continued to produce prints under the name Kunishige from 1849 until the time of his death. Others argue that ōkubi-e bust portraits signed by Kunishige and other works signed by Shigeharu dating to c.1849-1851 are likely the work of different artists.

Life dates	c.1802-1853
Career dates	c.1820-1849
Birth name	Yamaguchi Yasuhide [安秀]
Personal name	Yamaguchi Jinjirō [山口甚治郎]
Gō	Nagasaki Kunishige [長崎国重] (1821), Kunishige [国重], Nagasaki Shigeharu [長崎重春] (1821), Baigansai Kunishige [梅丸斎国重] (1821), Takigawa Kunishige [滝川国重] (1825), Ryūsai Shigeharu [柳窗重春/柳斎重春] (1825), Gyokuryūtei [玉柳亭] (1830), Gyokuryūtei Shigeharu [玉柳亭重春] (c. 1830-32), Gokuryūsai Shigeharu [玉柳斎重春]
Professional names	Yamaguchi Shigeharu [山口重春], Hōzan Shigeharu [烽山重春], Kiyoutei [崎陽亭], Nichika [日華]
Seals	Ryū [柳], Yamaguchi-uji Shigeharu [山口氏重春], Haru [春]
Mentors	Utagawa Kunihiro, Yanagawa Shigenobu
Pupils	Shigenao, Shigefusa, Shigeyasu, Shigetoyo, Shigeyoshi, Shigehiro, Shigemasa

== Works ==
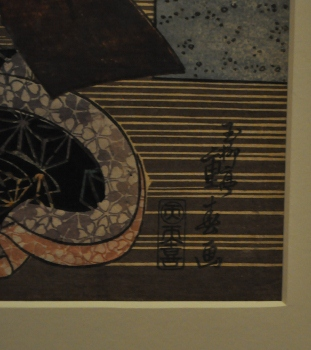
signature & seal

In the Bunsei (文政) era (4/1818-12/1830), Shigeharu began working in various media including single-sheet prints, book illustration, theater billboards and programs, and paintings. His artistic output is generally dated to the period c.1820-1849, with the years 1829-1831 marking the peak of his work in ichimai-e (一枚絵) single-sheet print design. There are several blank periods in his career from which no or very few prints are known, including mid-1822 through mid-1825 and 1838.

Among the highlights of this productive period was Nijūshidō no Uchi, an unusual series of twenty-four ōban prints published in 1829-1830, depicting Chinese legendary and historical figures whose spirit of self-sacrifice and filial devotion made them exemplary models of Confucian family and social values; the episodes are drawn from the Èrshísì Xiào, a classic text on Confucian filial piety compiled by Guo Jujing during the Yuan dynasty (1260–1368). Although surviving in few impressions, the existence of alternative editions with colour variations and worn blocks on some surviving impressions suggests the set was popular in its time. The series also predates the far better-known Morokoshi Nijūshi-kō by Kuniyoshi, published in 1848 by Daikokuya.

From 1831 on, Shigeharu provided illustrations for a number of books, including The Three Kingdoms of Actors' Customs Yakusha fūzoku sangokushi (役者風俗三国志). The work he did with his master, Shigenobu, on a book of fashionable patterns in courtesan clothing (Ryūko moyō chakui tayū no zu (竜虎紋様着衣太夫の図)) earned him particular acclaim. He also collaborated on book illustrations with the artists Gion Seitoku (祇園井特) and Mihata Jōryū (三畠上龍). He frequently worked in association with the Tenki (天喜) or Tenmaya Kihei (天満屋喜兵衛) publishing house. Operating under the firm name Kinkadō (金華堂), Tenki was active from 1816 into the early 1850s.

== Reputation ==
Contemporary estimations of Shigeharu's work tend to be favourable. According to a compendium of Osaka gossip published in 1835, Shigeharu was "good at everything." A manuscript of artist biographies from the mid-1840s characterizes him as "better than the rest," and notes his professional status. Modern critics, however, have been less positive, describing him as "an indifferent artist". This notwithstanding, Shigeharu was, if not the only professional ukiyo-e artist working in Osaka in the late nineteenth century, one of the very few on the amateur-dominated scene.

== Collections ==
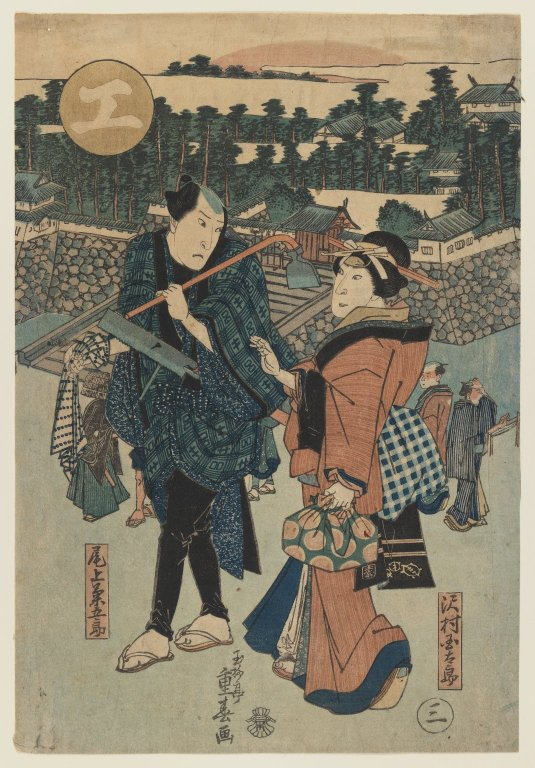
Onoe Kikugorō & Sawamura Kintarō

Ryūsai Shigeharu's work is found in many collections, including the following:

- "MFA Boston".
- "The Pushkin".
- "The British Museum".
- The ROM
- "The Walters Art Museum".
- "Brooklyn Museum".
- "Honolulu Museum".
- "Rijksmuseum".

== See also ==
- Actor Arashi Rikan II as Osome (Ryūsai Shigeharu)
- Konishi Hirosada
