= Bust portrait of Actor Kataoka Ichizō I =

Bust Portrait of Actor Kataoka Ichizō I
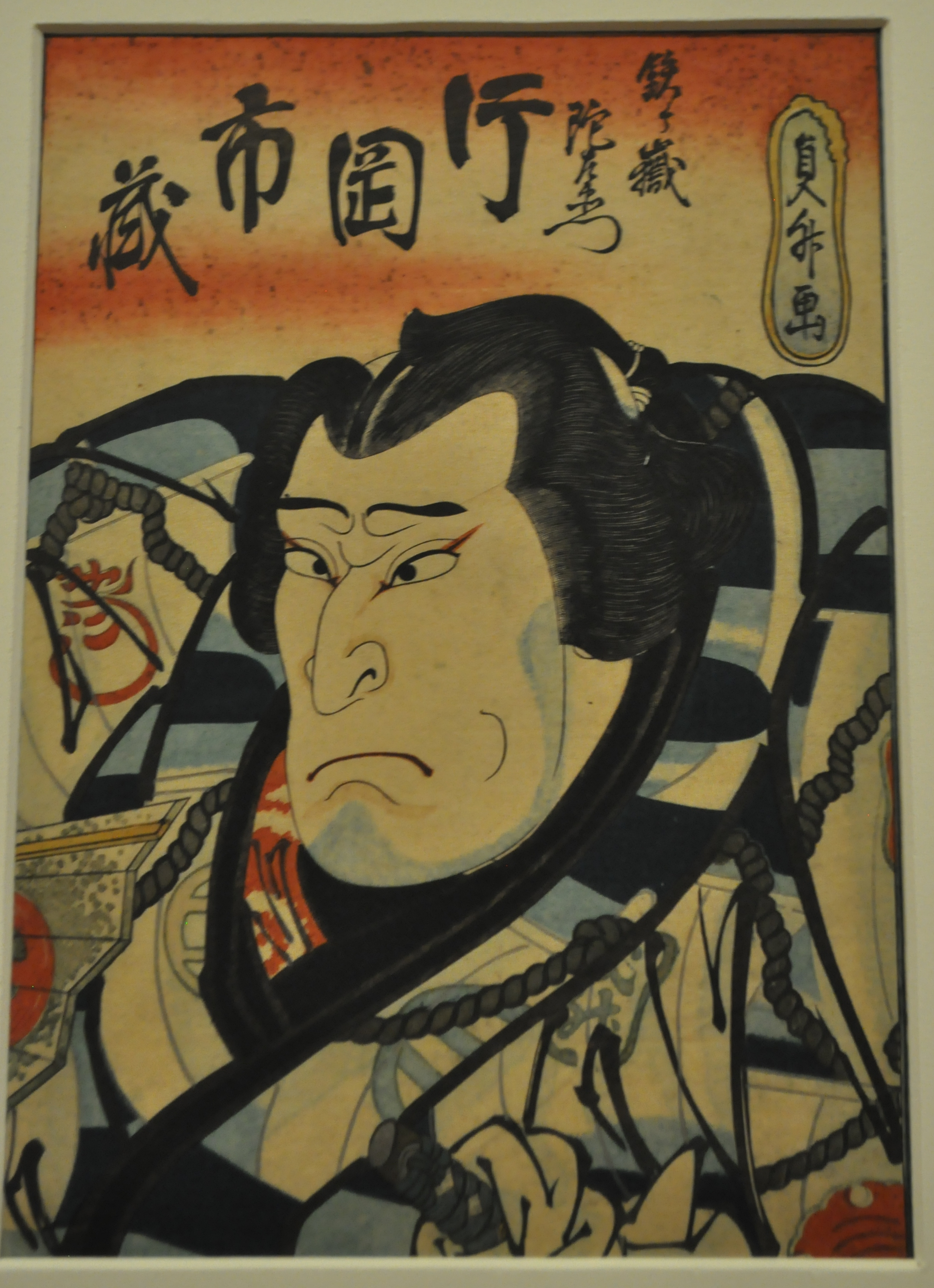
- Bust Portrait of Actor Kataoka Ichizō I by Sadamasu
- Artist: Sadamasu
- Year: 1849–1862
- Type: nishiki-e woodblock print, ink and color on paper
- Condition: on display (since November 2013)
- Location: Royal Ontario Museum; Toronto
- Owner: Royal Ontario Museum
- Accession: 926.18.1205

Bust portrait of Actor Kataoka Ichizō I is an ukiyo-e woodblock print belonging to the permanent collection of the Royal Ontario Museum, Canada. The print dates to around the mid nineteenth century, and is an example of kamigata-e, prints produced in the Osaka and Kyoto areas. The ROM attributes the print to Utagawa Sadamasu II, but other institutions identify Utagawa Kunimasu—also known as Sadamasu I—as the artist.

== Print details ==
- Medium: kamigata nishiki-e [上方錦絵] woodblock print; ink and colour on paper
- Size: chūban
- Format: tate-e, right sheet of diptych
- Genre: yakusha-e, ōkubi-e
- Japanese title: none
- Exhibit title: Bust Portrait of Actor Kataoka Ichizō I
- Subject character name: Tetsugadake Dazaemon
- Subject play name: Sekitori Senryō Nobori [関取千両幟] (The Rise of the 1000 Ryō Wrestler / The Sumo Wrestler's Banner)
- Inscription: Tetsugadake Dazaemon [鉄が嶽陀左衛門] Kataoka Ichizō [片岡市蔵] (right to left)
- Signature: Sadamasu ga [貞升画] in toshidama-in cartouche
- Publisher's mark: none
- Publisher's seal: none
- Censor seal: none
- Date seal: none
- Credit line: Gift of Sir Edmund Walker

=== Medium ===
Kamigata-e [上方絵] is the term used to collectively describe ukiyo-e prints from Kamigata, the Osaka and Kyoto regions. The earliest documented examples are from a book illustrated by Ōoka Shunboku [大岡春卜] (1680-1763) published 1746. The most popular subject for kamigata-e was kabuki theatre, with single sheet yakusha-e coming into production in the mid-eighteenth century, a full century after the genre debuted in Edo. The major technical difference between Edo and Kamigata prints is the latter's use of kappazuri stencil printing, where colours were brushed onto paper with the aid of paper stencil patterns. This developed in Osaka around the same time as nishiki-e appeared in Edo. Also distinctive about kamigata-e is that its producers were not professional artists like their Edo counterparts. Instead, they were talented amateurs whose artistic interests were secondary to their passion for kabuki and its actors.

=== Size ===
Measuring approximately 18 by 25 cm, chūban [中判] is the name of a standard medium-sized print. This smaller format underwent a revival from 1847 on, replacing ōban as the dominant format for kamigata-e. Sadamasu/ Kunimasu was particularly influential in its popularization.

=== Format ===
While Bust Portrait of Actor Kataoka Ichizō I is an ichimai-e [一枚絵] single-sheet print, it is also the right half of a diptych. Its partner to the left is Sadamasu's portrait of actor Arashi Tokusaburō III [嵐徳三郎] (1812-1863) as the play's hero, Iwanaga Jirōkichi [岩川次郎吉]. The image is identically formatted with the exception of the actor's head angle, which mirrors that of Kataoka Ichizō's.

=== Genre ===
This print is an example of the yakusha-e [役者絵] genre, that is "a type of ukiyo-e print which shows one or several actors in a stage pose or costume," which appeared in the late seventeenth century. Their rise in popularity kept pace with general interest in kabuki, and attempted to appeal to the public's curiosity about individual actors. These actor portraits were so marketable that most artists active in the late Edo period worked in the genre.

This portrait also belongs to a yakusha-e subgenre known as ōkubi-e [大首絵]. Literally "large head pictures", these images depict their subjects'—typically beauties or kabuki actors—heads or heads and torsos. The lone figures are set against plain backgrounds, and often captured in a dramatic mie [見得] pose. As JAANUS notes, "the close-up range of ookubi-e allowed the designer to emphasize particular facial features, expression, make-up or poses of favorite actors in popular roles." Utagawa Kunimasu (Sadamasu I) is credited with advancing the mature Osaka style of ōkubi-e in the chūban format, after creating his first around 1837.

=== Subject ===
The print depicts actor Kataoka Ichizō I as Tetsugadake Dazaemon in the play Sekitori Senryō Nobori [関取千両幟].

Kataoka Ichizō I [片岡市蔵] (1792-1862) was a celebrated Edo period kabuki actor based in Osaka. He was known for his portrayal of villains in katakiyaku [敵役] and jitsuaku [実悪] roles. He was the progenitor of the Kataoka Ichizō line, which continues to this day in its sixth generation. Ichizō I held the name from 1810 to 1858 and from 1859 to his death in 1862. Sekitori Senryō Nobori [関取千両幟] by Chikamatsu Hanji was originally written for the bunraku [文楽] puppet theatre, but adapted soon after for kabuki. It was first performed in Osaka in 1775. Translated as The Rise of the 1000 Ryō Wrestler or The Sumo Wrestler's Banner, it tells the story of a young sumo wrestler's moral dilemma revolving around debt and duty. Tetsugadake Dazaemon is the rival who is ultimately defeated by the hero in the ring.

=== Artist ===
The print's attribution is a subject of some contention. Copies of the print belong to at least 2 public collections: that of the ROM, and that of Boston's Museum of Fine Arts. According to its labeling, these institutions disagree on when and by whom it was produced. The problem lies mainly in the fact that the print has no date stamp and is signed Sadamasu ga [貞升画], a name used by two nineteenth century Osaka print-makers: Sadamasu I and Sadamasu II.

==== Sadamasu I (Kunimasu) ====
Sadamasu's personal details are largely unknown, though his output is generally dated to the early 1830s through the early 1850s. He was a wealthy property owner, and possibly operated a shipbuilding company. Sometime between 1828 and 1830 he travelled to Edo to study under Utagawa Kunisada. His earliest known print, signed "eshi Utagawa Sadamasu ga" (painted by Utagawa Sadamasu) [絵師歌川貞升画], dates to early 1830. He officially changed his artist name to Kunimasu [國升 or 國益] in 1848, in recognition of Kunisada's accession to the title Toyokuni. Kunimasu produced mainly yakusha-e, portraits of kabuki actors active in Osaka. His works are credited with bold use of colour, decisive brushwork and "tour-de-force techniques". Late in his career, he turned to painting, adopting the style of the Shijō school. Kunimasu actively supported Osaka printmaking by opening his own print design school, and directly mentoring many local artists. Among his pupils are: Sadayuki [貞雪] (fl. 1839-1840), Utagawa Hirosada [歌川 廣貞] (fl. 1835-1850s), Masusada [升貞] (fl. 1848-1849) and Sadamasu II [貞升] (fl. 1849).

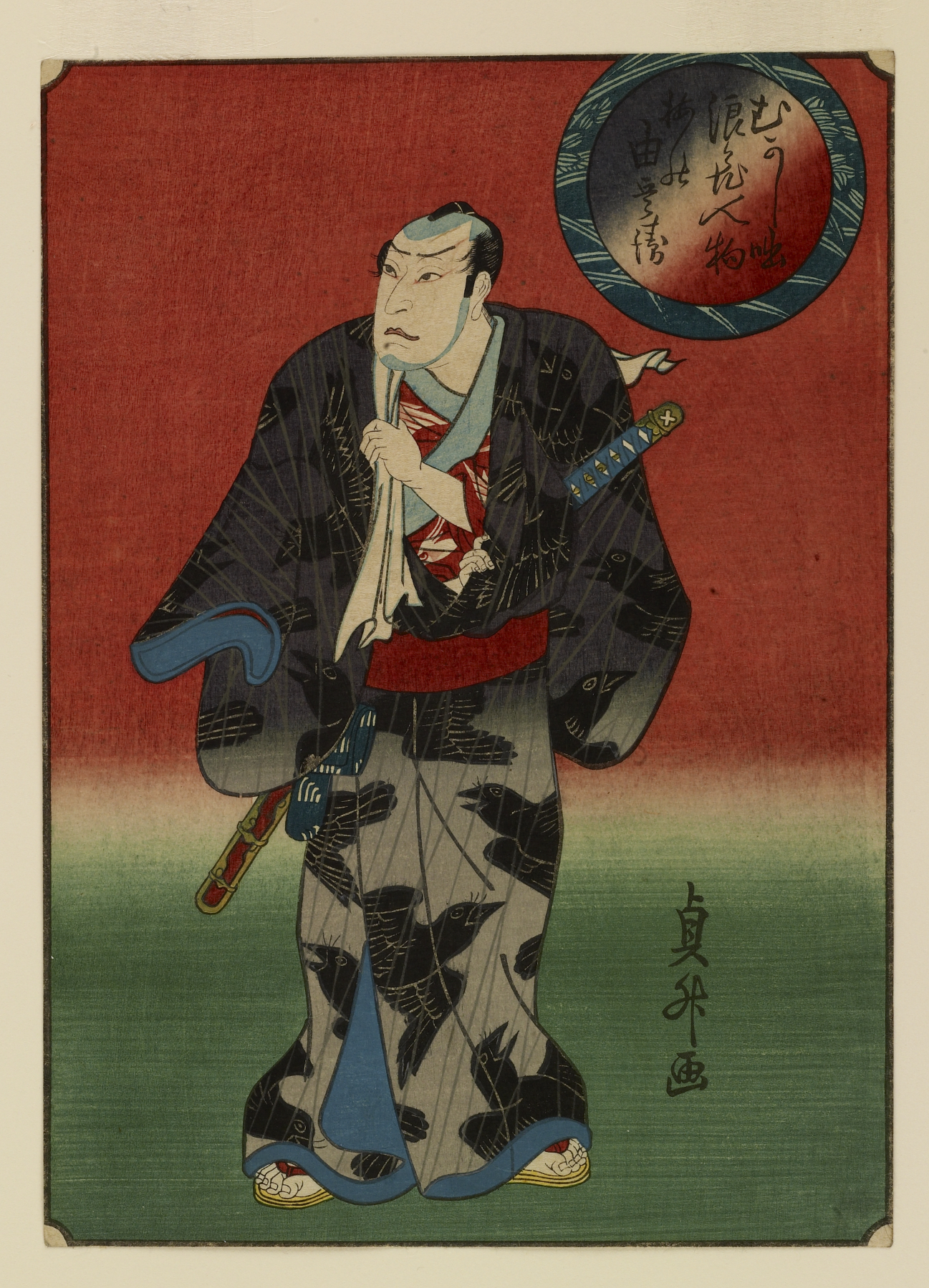
print credited to Sadamasu II in Walters Art Museum

==== Sadamasu II ====
Even less is known about Sadamasu II [二代貞升] than about his predecessor. His active period was very brief, spanning only c. 1849-1850. According to Doesburg, "Sadamasu II created only a few prints and from these it is obvious that he was not highly gifted." He is identified as a pupil of Kunimasu in the inscription on an undated chūban print.

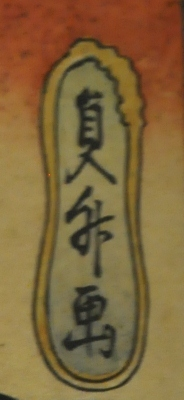
Utagawa Sadamasu (Kunimasu) signature cartouche

=== Marks ===
The print has no visible date, censor or artist seals. The only distinctive mark is the toshidama-in cartouche encasing Sadamasu's signature. A symbol of good luck, this was customarily used by artists of the Utagawa school beginning with Toyokuni I in around 1809. It was Kunisada (Toyokuni III), however, who really claimed the symbol for his school, elongating its round shape and framing the red infill with yellow. In Sadamasu's print, the characteristic yellow outline encloses pale blue infill.

=== Date ===
Just as the ROM and MFA Boston disagree on the print's artist, the museums assign different dates to the piece. While the ROM believes it to belong to the period 1849-1862, MFA Boston dates it earlier and more precisely at 1839.

Assuming it to be the work of Sadamasu II, it would have to have been produced during that artist's brief window of activity, which is to say 1849-1850.

In the event that Sadamasu I is the artist, the date can be narrowed based on the following:

- The print belongs to Sadamasu's mature period, but prior to 1848's official name change to Kunimasu
- Actor Arashi Tokusaburō III appeared under that name from the fall or winter of 1830 to the 10th lunar month of 1834, then again from the 6th lunar month of 1837 to the 10th lunar month of 1843
- Enactment of the Tenpō Reforms from 1841 to 1843 resulted in a hiatus in yakusha-e production during the early 1840s
- Inscriptions of actor and role names disappeared from covert yakusha-e under the Tenpō Reforms and did not reappear until around 1855
- Surviving records of Edo period kabuki performances show that Sekitori Senryō Nobori was performed at Osaka's Ōnishi [大西] theatre in the eighth lunar month of the year Tenpō 10, i.e. 1839

The above would seem to indicate that the print, if the work of Sadamasu I, belongs to the period 1837-1843, with 1839—as the Museum of Fine Arts, Boston claims—being a likely date.

=== Provenance ===
The print was given to the ROM by Sir Edmund Walker (1848–1924), president of the Canadian Bank of Commerce and first Chairman of the Board of Trustees for the ROM. Walker began collecting Japanese art in the 1870s, making him one of the earliest North American collectors. He bought many pieces in New York in the 1870s and '80s, and during a trip to London in 1909. In 1919, after travelling to Japan, China and Korea, he was named Honorary Consul-General of Japan for Toronto.

== See also ==
- Utagawa Kunimasu
- Kataoka Ichizō
- Spring and autumn landscapes (Hara Zaishō) - hanging scroll in same gallery
- Unit 88-9 (Kiyomizu Masahiro) - sculpture in same gallery
- Female Ghost (Kunisada) - print in same gallery
- Fan print with two bugaku dancers (Kunisada) - print in same gallery
- Ichikawa Omezō as a Pilgrim and Ichikawa Yaozō as a Samurai (Toyokuni I) - print in same gallery
- Eijudō Hibino at Seventy-one (Toyokuni I) - print in same gallery
- View of Tempōzan Park in Naniwa (Gochōtei Sadamasu) - print in same collection
- Actor Arashi Rikan II as Osome (Ryūsai Shigeharu) - print in same collection
- Two Actors in Samurai Roles (Gosotei Hirosada) - print in same collection

== External sources ==
- http://woodblockprints.org/index.php/Detail/Object/Show/object_id/1109 - Sadamasu print featuring Kataoka Ichizō I
- https://www.britishmuseum.org/research/collection_online/collection_object_details.aspx?objectId=776048&partId=1&people=146300&peoA=146300-2-59&page=1 - Kunimasu print of Kataoka Ichizō I in the British Museum
- https://www.rijksmuseum.nl/en/search?s=objecttype&ps=12&f.principalMaker.sort=Kunimasu&ii=0&p=1 - Kunimasu prints in the Rijksmuseum collection
- https://www.rijksmuseum.nl/en/search?s=objecttype&ps=12&f.principalMaker.sort=Sadamasu%20II&ii=0&p=1 - Sadamasu II prints in the Rijksmuseum collection
