= Eijudō Hibino at Seventy-one (Toyokuni I) =

Woodblock print

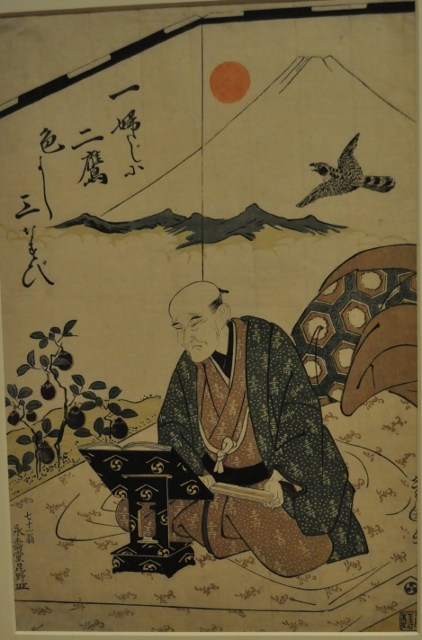
- Portrait commemorating 71st year of print publisher Nishimuraya Yohachi
- Artist: Utagawa Toyokuni I
- Year: c. 1799
- Type: ukiyo-e woodblock print
- Dimensions: 38 cm × 25 cm (14.5 in × 9.5 in)
- Condition: not currently on display
- Location: Royal Ontario Museum, Toronto
- Owner: Royal Ontario Museum
- Accession: 926.18.482

Eijūdō Hibino at Seventy-one is an ukiyo-e woodblock print dating to around 1799 by Edo period artist Utagawa Toyokuni I. According to its inscription, the print was produced in commemoration of the featured subject, print publisher Nishimuraya Yohachi I's, seventy-first year. The print is part of the permanent collection of the Royal Ontario Museum, Toronto, Canada.

== Utagawa Toyokuni I ==
Utagawa Toyokuni (歌川豐國), also known as Toyokuni I, was the second head of the Utagawa school, and one of the most influential and prolific print-makers of the Edo period. From early adolescence, he apprenticed with Utagawa Toyoharu, studying the style of his mentor, as well as those of Chōbunsai Eishi, Utamaro and Eishōsai Chōki. He achieved his greatest commercial success within the genres of bijinga (prints of beautiful women) and, more significantly, kabuki-e and yakusha-e (kabuki and kabuki actor prints). The latter constitute the "overwhelming majority" of his works.

His style is praised for its "powerful and vivid lines," "striking color contrasts," "decorative bombast," and "bold, taut designs." He is credited with innovating polyptych formats, and with training prominent pupils, including Kunisada and Kuniyoshi. The copiousness stemming from his success appears to have taken a toll, however. The contemporary consensus is that the quality of his later work "shows a marked decline," and even "degenerated frequently into sheer grotesquerie." Some contend his talent was "predominantly imitative," resulting more from study than "intuitive genius."

== Nishimuraya Yohachi ==
Nishimuraya Yohachi (dates unknown) was one of the leading print publishers of the late 18th century. He founded the Nishimuraya Yohachi publishing house, also known as Nishiyo (西与), which operated in Nihonbashi's Bakurochō Nichōme under the shop name Eijudō. The firm's exact dates are unclear, but many art historians date its activity to between c. 1751 and 1860.

According to Andreas Marks, Nishimuraya's "success came from engaging the best artists and providing a broad range of prints to satisfy the public's interest." One of the press' most significant products was Hokusai's Thirty-six Views of Mount Fuji, which appeared between c. 1830 and 1833. In addition to Hokusai and Toyokuni I, Nishimuraya Yohachi published prints by Chobunsai Eishi, Utagawa Kuniyasu and Utagawa Kunisada. Nishimuraya's store is immortalized in the 1787 print Scene of Print Buyers at the Shop of Nishimuraya Yohachi (Eijudou) on New Year’s Day by Torii Kiyonaga (1752-1815).

== Print details ==
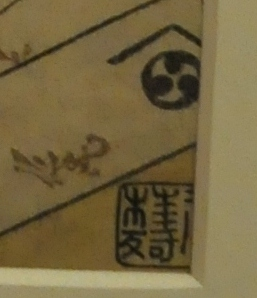
Nishimuraya mitsu tomoe publisher's mark above seal

- Medium: nishiki-e woodblock print on paper
- Size: oban
- Format: tate-e
- Japanese title: none
- Exhibit title: Portrait of Publisher Eijudō Hibino at age 71
- Subject: commemoration of 71st year of Nishimuraya Yohachi
- Text: ichi fuji ni/ ni taka iro yoshi/ san nasubi (First Fuji/ second a hawk of good colour/ third an eggplant); top left side of print
- Inscription: nanajūissai/ Eijūdō Hibino (七十一翁永寿堂日比野); lower left edge
- Signature: Toyokuni ga (豊国画), lower right edge (obscured by mat)
- Publisher mark: Mitsu tomoe mark (Nishimuraya Yohachi), lower right edge below signature
- Publisher seal: Eiju han (Nishimuraya Yohachi - 西村屋与八), bottom right corner (partially obscured by mat)
- Censor seal: none
- Date seal: none
- Genre: portrait
- Credit line: Gift of Sir Edmund Walker

=== Image ===
Depicted in the print is the seventy-one-year-old Nishimuraya Yohachi, seated on his mattress and bedding in front of a painted byōbu (屏風) folding screen. He is dressed formally in a winter haori coat and kimono, both decorated with a pattern of repeated 寿 (kotobuki) characters. Not only does this character signify "longevity," but it is also the second character in Eijudō (永寿堂), the name of Nishimuraya's shop.

On his lap, he holds a folded fan. He sits before a small, black lacquer lectern emblazoned with the mitsu tomoe logo representing his publishing house. Resting on the stand is an open book upon which Nishimuraya's gaze is resting. Given the fan and his posture, it is likely that he is engaging in the New Year's convention of reciting nō plays, an intended indication of the elegance and erudition of this "man of taste."

=== Text & symbolism ===
The text appearing in the upper left area of the print repeats a popular verse or proverb relating to Japanese New Year:

- 一富士に (Ichi Fuji ni) : First, Fuji.
- 二鷹 (ni taka) : Second, a hawk.
- 色よし (iro yoshi) : Of good colour,
- 三茄子 (san nasubi) : Third, an eggplant.

The imagery of the verse is echoed in the screen design, which features an outline of Mount Fuji, a soaring hawk and an eggplant. These three elements belong to the hatsuyume (初夢) or 'First Dream' tradition, a belief that, when seen in order in the first dream of the year, these items augur good fortune. This was a popular notion by the mid-seventeenth century, and is a common motif in prints and paintings from the period. These images continue to appear on new year greeting cards (nengajō - 年賀状) to this day.

The auspiciousness of these objects can be attributed to a variety of factors. In Edo era Japan, hawks were considered "natural emblems of the Japanese warrior class due to their keen eyesight, their predatory nature, and their boldness." The homophone 高 (taka) means 'great' or 'high.' The eggplant has long been considered to have associations with fertility, and is also a homophone for 成す (nasu), "to accomplish; to achieve; to succeed in." 'Fuji' (富士), when written with the homophone kanji characters 不 (fu - not/ un-) and 死 (ji - death), can be interpreted to mean 'immortality.' When taken as a group, the combination of the syllables fuji, taka, nasu can also be read as homophones for "unparalleled success."

Some have suggested that the text's calligraphy and even the images on the screen backdrop may have been done by Nishimuraya Yohachi himself. According to the Museum Angewandte Kunst, Nishimuraya's involvement is hinted at by "the fact that a kakihan [書判] or paraphe [sic] follows Eijudō's signature."

=== Fuji-kō ===
Nishimuraya Yohachi is known to have been a member of the Fuji-kō, an Edo period cult centred around Mount Fuji. Founded by an ascetic named Hasegawa Kakugyō (1541-1646), the cult venerated the mountain as a female deity, and encouraged its members to climb it. In doing so, they would be reborn, "purified and... able to find happiness." The cult waned in the Meiji period, and, though it persists to this day, it has been subsumed into Shintō sects.

The publisher's association with the Fuji-kō gives clues not only to imagery in his portrait, but also to his eagerness to participate in the production of Hokusai's series celebrating Mount Fuji.

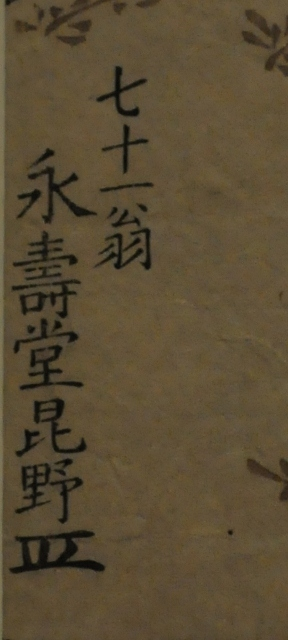
"Age 71/ Eijudo Hibino"

=== Memorialization ===
Many art historians suggest that the portrait was likely a private commission based on the print's content and the fact that it has no kiwame-in censor seal. The precise reason for the print's production is less clear, however. Some describe it as a New Year's gift from the publisher to friends, others feel it was issued to "celebrate both the New Year and Nishimura Yohachi’s longevity," still others think it was an acknowledgement of Nishimuraya's 71st birthday. It is also possible that it was issued to memorialize the publisher having experienced hatsuyume.

What is fairly universally accepted is that it is a very rare and notable work, being "one of the few ichimai-e [single sheet prints] of the 18th century to feature neither a bijin nor an actor." There is an ukiyo-e genre known as shini-e devoted to memorializing the dead, particularly artists. Alternatively, the nigao-e genre of 'likeness pictures' constitutes portraits—often head-shots—of mainly actors. There is, however, within the universe of Edo era ukiyo-e, no tradition of personal portraiture of non-celebrities as exemplified in this print.

=== Date ===
The ROM dates the print to c. 1799, which is in line with the data offered by the Museum of Fine Arts, Boston and the Museum Angewandte Kunst in Frankfurt. Both the Honolulu Museum of Art and the British Museum date the print slightly earlier at 1797-1798. The Art Institute of Chicago narrows the date to 1798.

Art historians are also divided in their estimates of the print's age. Clark believes the print to be from 1797-1798 based on the similarity of its signature to those on other works known to be from that period. Volker links it to "about 1790," while Newland describes the image as having been produced "in the 1790s."

=== Provenance ===
The print was donated to the ROM by Sir Edmund Walker (1848–1924), long-time president of the Canadian Bank of Commerce and first Chairman of the Board of Trustees for the ROM. Walker began collecting Japanese art in the 1870s, making him one of the earliest North American collectors. He bought many pieces in New York in the 1870s and '80s, and during a trip to London in 1909. In 1919, after travelling to Japan, China and Korea, he was named Honorary Consul-General of Japan for Toronto.

== Copies in other collections ==
=== Museum of Fine Arts, Boston ===
- Object title: Eijudô Hibino (Publisher Nishimuraya Yohachi) at Seventy-one (Nanajû-ichi ô Eijudô Hibino)
- Date: Edo period, c. 1799 (Kansei 11)
- Accession number: 06.1059
- Provenance: March 8, 1906; gift of Denman Waldo Ross
- Credit line: Denman Waldo Ross Collection
- Status: Not on view

=== Honolulu Museum of Art ===
- Object title: Portrait of Publisher Nishimuraya Yohachi I on His Seventy-first Birthday
- Date: c. 1797-1798
- Accession number: 21803
- Provenance: 1991; Gift of James A. Michener

=== British Museum ===
- Object title: A memorial portrait of Konno of Eijudo Press at the age of 71
- Date: 1797-1798
- Accession number: 1921,0216,0.3
- Provenance: 1921; purchased from Kato Shozo (加藤章造)

=== Museum Angewandte Kunst (Museum of Applied Arts), Frankfurt ===
- Object title: Old Eijudō Hibino at Seventy-one (Portrait of the Publisher Nishimuraya Yohachi)
- Date: 1799
- Provenance: 2013; Otto Riese Collection
- Credit line: Otto Riese Collection
- Status: Not on view

=== Edo-Tokyo Museum ===
- Object title: Portrait of the Publisher Eijudo Hibino (Nishimuraya Yohachi)
- Accession number: 96200353

=== Art Institute of Chicago ===
- Object title: Portrait of Eijudo at Seventy-one
- Date: 1798
- Accession number: 1925.3144
- Provenance: 1925; Clarence Buckingham
- Credit line: Clarence Buckingham Collection
- Status: Not on display

== See also ==
- Fan print with two bugaku dancers (Kunisada) - Print from same collection, same provenance
- Female Ghost (Kunisada) - Print from same collection
- Ichikawa Omezō as a Pilgrim and Ichikawa Yaozō as a Samurai (Toyokuni I) - Print from same collection
- Unit 88-9 (Kiyomizu Masahiro) - Ceramic sculpture from same collection
- Spring and autumn landscapes (Hara Zaishō) - Painting from same collection
- Bust portrait of Actor Kataoka Ichizō I (Gochōtei Sadamasu II) - Print from same collection
- View of Tempōzan Park in Naniwa (Gochōtei Sadamasu) - Print from same collection

== External sources ==
- Ichi fuji ni taka san nasubi print by Kitagawa Utamaro c. 1798-1801
- Dream Symbols of the New Year: Hawk, Eggplant and Mount Fuji print by Isoda Koryūsai (1735–1790)
