= Ichikawa Omezō as a Pilgrim and Ichikawa Yaozō as a Samurai (Toyokuni I) =

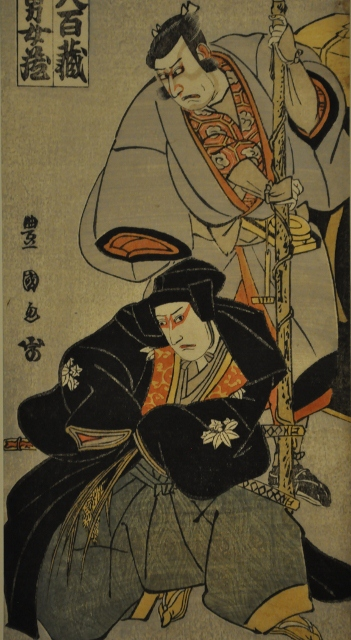
- Woodblock print by Toyokuni I in ROM's collection of Japanese art
- Artist: Utagawa Toyokuni I
- Year: c. 1801
- Type: ukiyo-e woodblock print
- Condition: not currently on display
- Location: Royal Ontario Museum, Toronto
- Owner: Royal Ontario Museum
- Accession: 926.18.498

Ichikawa Omezō as a Pilgrim and Ichikawa Yaozō as a Samurai is an ukiyo-e woodblock print dating to around 1801 by Edo period artist Utagawa Toyokuni I. Featuring two of the most prominent actors of the day as characters in a contemporary kabuki drama, it is a classic example of the kabuki-e or yakusha-e genre. The print is part of the permanent collection of the Royal Ontario Museum, Toronto, Canada.

== Toyokuni and kabuki ==
Utagawa Toyokuni (歌川豐國), also known as Toyokuni I, was the second head of the Utagawa school, and one of the most influential print-makers of the Edo period. From early adolescence, he apprenticed with Utagawa Toyoharu, studying the style of his mentor, as well as those of Chōbunsai Eishi, Utamaro and Eishōsai Chōki.

Although his initial attempts met with failure, Toyokuni achieved commercial success in 1786 with illustrations for the kibyōshi novelette Tsugamonai hanashi no oyadama (無束話親玉). He soon discovered his niches: bijinga and, more significantly, yakusha-e. Between 1794 and 1796, he created a series of prints entitled Yakusha butai no sugata-e ("Portraits of Actors in Various Roles" - 役者舞台の姿絵), which earned him "rapid recognition", and "marked the peak of his creative work". Toyokuni befriended prominent actors, and the "overwhelming majority" of his prints relate to kabuki.

Toyokuni's style is admired for its "powerful and vivid lines", "striking color contrasts", "decorative bombast", and "bold, taut designs". He is credited with the innovation of polyptych formats, and with training many prominent pupils, including future masters Kunisada and Kuniyoshi.

Toyokuni is often compared with Sharaku, an artist active during 1794 who specialized in yakusha-e. While Sharaku favoured an exaggerated, stylized approach, Toyokuni's depictions are more realistic, capturing actors "as they appear on stage" and idealizing them. His kabuki-e were more popular with contemporary audiences than those of his rival; however, modern critics tend to credit Sharaku with greater artistic acuity.

Toyokuni was highly prolific, and, by 1800, the Utagawa school had supplanted the Katsukawa as the major producer of kabuki-e. His success appears to have come at a price, however, as the consensus is that the quality of his later work "shows a marked decline", and even "degenerated frequently into sheer grotesquerie". Some also contend Toyokuni's talent was "predominantly imitative", more the product of study than "intuitive genius".

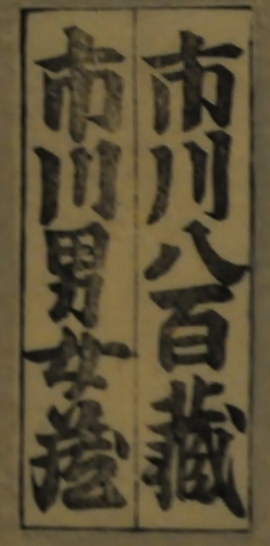
left to right: Ichikawa Yaozō, Ichikawa Omezō

== Ichikawa Omezō as a Pilgrim and Ichikawa Yaozō as a Samurai ==
=== Genre ===
An image of two actors posing as characters from a play, this print belongs to the kabuki-e (歌舞伎絵) genre, also known as shibai-e (芝居絵), gekijou-e (劇場絵), gekiga (劇画). Literally 'kabuki pictures', kabuki-e began to be produced in the late 17th century. As kabuki grew in popularity, audiences became increasingly interested in the actors. The emergence of star actors led to yakusha-e (役者絵), a subgenre of kabuki-e in which actors were depicted individually or, as in this print, in pairs. These images appeared as single-sheet prints or in books of actor prints called yakusha ehon (役者絵本).

=== Image ===
In this print, Toyokuni depicts a tableau of two of the most popular kabuki actors of the day in a scene from an unidentified play. The character in the foreground is a samurai. He wears waraji straw sandals, a casual black eboshi cap, and a two-piece kamishimo under a black haori coat. The handles of his two swords peak out behind him on the left, the customary position. His red kumadori makeup is typical of main characters, signifying "bravado and a forceful personality". Hanging down over his right knee is a handful of wheat or rice stalks, which are presumably an element of the drama.

The standing figure is in typical pilgrim or travelling priest garb: waraji, a grey robe, and light-coloured leggings and arm covers. In addition, he wears a gong around his waist and carries a shakujō (錫杖) pilgrim's staff. Behind him, the body and straps of a portable shrine are just visible. Heroes and their foes disguising themselves as pilgrims is a popular kabuki motif. The character's aggressive pose—right arm removed from his robe, menacing facial expression—indicates that he is likely not a benign pilgrim.

=== Play ===
Beyond the names of two of the actors involved, there is very little in this print to identify the play it documents. Although some kabuki-e and yakusha-e include character or play names, this print offers neither. In addition, having no date stamp or censor seal makes it difficult to identify the play by date.

Records of Edo period kabuki reveal that early in 1798 Yaozō and Omezō appeared together in the play "Tomioka koi no yamabiraki" (also known as "Ninin Shimbei"). Extant images by Toyokuni known to be from this performance—including one featuring Yaozō—however, are very different in style and format from the ROM's print.

In 1803, Yaozō is known to have appeared in Yoshitsune Sembon Zakura, a drama featuring priest and monk characters. As the cast list has been lost, it is unknown whether Omezō also appeared. One Toyokuni print of Yaozō from this play is done in a similar style as the ROM's print, however, the costume is quite different.

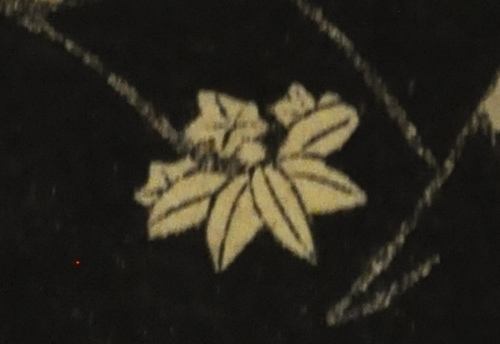
kaemon detail

=== Ichikawa Yaozō III ===
Both the name cartouche in the upper left-hand corner and the kaemon (替紋) personal crest appearing on the kimono arms of the crouching figure in the foreground identify him as Ichikawa Yaozō III (市川八百蔵) (1747–1818). Yaozō, whose professional debut was in 1760, came from a family of kabuki performers. He trained with two very different masters: celebrated onnagata (female role actor) Segawa Kikunojō II, and aragoto ('rough style') master Ichikawa Danjūrō V. He was particularly admired for his performance of wajitsu (calm, clever male hero) roles, and for his portrayal of young women. He appears in several prints by Toyokuni, as well as in prints by Katsukawa Shunkō, Katsukawa Shun'ei and Sharaku.

Stage names	Suketakaya Takasuke II	Suketakaya Shirogorō	Ichikawa Yaozō III	Segawa Yūjirō I	Sawamura Shirogorō I	Sawamura Kimpei I
Literary names	Kōga	Chūsha	Shabo	Kion	Roshū	
Other names	Ichikawa Chūsha III					
Guilds	Kinokuniya	Tachibanaya				
Masters	Ichikawa Danjūrō V	Segawa Kikunojō II				
Specialty roles	wajitsu (和実 - calm, clever males)	wakaonnagata (若女方 - young females)				

=== Ichikawa Omezō I ===
According to the name cartouche, the standing figure is Ichikawa Omezō I (市川男女蔵) (1781-1833), the first actor in a line of 6 generations continuing to the present day. He specialized in dramatic male tachiyaku (立役) and in jitsuaku (実悪) evil warrior roles. Not surprisingly, given his stature as a kabuki star, he was a popular subject for Toyokuni. One of his most famous portraits is Toyokuni's of him in the famous drama Shibaraku.

Stage names	Ichikawa Benzō II	Ichikawa Omezō I	Ichikawa Bennosuke
Literary names	Shinsha	Kaigan	
Guild	Takinoya		
Masters	Ichikawa Danjūrō V		
Specialty roles	tachiyaku (立役 - males)	jitsuaku (実悪 - villains)	

=== Date ===
The ROM labels the print as c. 1801. Although the print has no discernible date or censor seals, Several factors indicate that the print most likely dates to between 1800 and 1804:

- Toyokuni began working with printer Iseya Magobei in 1795, and did a series of "oblong prints of actor pairs" for the publisher in the early 1800s
- Ichikawa Yaozō III took the name Suketakaya Takasuke II in 1804 and ceased to be known as Ichikawa Yaozō

=== Provenance ===
The print was donated to the ROM by Sir Edmund Walker (1848–1924), long-time president of the Canadian Bank of Commerce and first Chairman of the Board of Trustees for the ROM. Walker began collecting Japanese art in the 1870s, making him one of the earliest North American collectors. He bought many pieces in New York in the 1870s and '80s, and during a trip to London in 1909. In 1919, after travelling to Japan, China and Korea, he was named Honorary Consul-General of Japan for Toronto.

== Print details ==
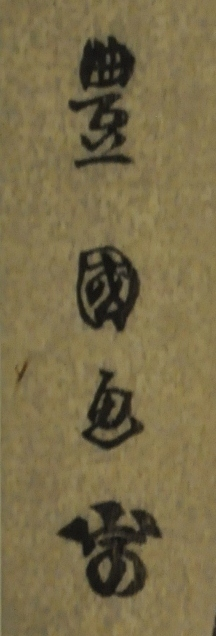
"Toyokuni ga" / "Iseya Magobei"

- Medium: nishiki-e woodblock print on paper
- Size: chūban
- Format: tate-e
- Japanese title: none
- Exhibit title: Ichikawa Omezō as a Pilgrim and Ichikawa Yaozō as a Samurai
- Subject: scene from an unspecified kabuki play
- Signature: Toyokuni ga (豊国画), left centre edge
- Publisher: Iseya Magobei (伊勢屋孫兵衛)
- Publisher's mark: Isemago/ Iseson, below signature
- Censor seal: none
- Date seal: none
- Genre: yakusha-e, kabuki-e
- Credit line: Gift of Sir Edmund Walker

== See also ==
- Fan print with two bugaku dancers (Kunisada) - Print from same collection, same provenance
- Female Ghost (Kunisada) - Print from same collection
- Unit 88-9 (Kiyomizu Masahiro) - Ceramic sculpture from same collection
- Spring and autumn landscapes (Hara Zaishō) - Painting from same collection
- Eijudō Hibino at Seventy-one (Toyokuni I) - Print from same collection
- Bust portrait of Actor Kataoka Ichizō I (Gochōtei Sadamasu II) - Print in same gallery
- View of Tempōzan Park in Naniwa (Gochōtei Sadamasu) - Print in same gallery

== Notes ==
Footnotes
1. Percival purports that Toyokuni was considered "Utamaro's closest rival in bijinga."
2. According to Marks, by the time of his death at age 57, Toyokuni had produced more than 90 print series, over 400 illustrated books, and several hundred single sheet prints.
3. "The upper piece was called the kataginu, and was essentially a sleeveless jacket or vest with exaggerated shoulders.... The lower piece was the hakama: wide, flowing trousers."
4. The JAANUS website offers further subgenres of yakusha-e: ōkubi-e bust portraits, zenshin-zu full-length portraits, scenes inside dressing rooms, mitate-e parody pictures, shini-e death portraits.
5. Print catalogue at the British Museum and print catalogue at the Tobacco and Salt Museum.
6. Print JPEG available via zoom.mfa.org. Accessed 6 June 2022.
7. Yaozō's other official mark, which appears in some other prints, involves 3 concentric squares, the innermost being black with a white 八 (hachi) character in its centre
8. His father was actor Sawamura Sōjūrō II, and his brother was actor Sawamura Sōjūrō III. (Shōriya 2013).
9. Ichikawa Omezô VI (1967- ) took the name in May 2003.
10. Print catalogue at the V&A.
11. From 1790 until 1876, the shogunate required that prints offered for public sale be assessed by official censors. Once approved, a print would be marked with the censor's name seal and a date stamp. This practice did not apply to private surimono prints or shunga erotica.

== External sources ==
- c. 1800 Toyokuni print featuring Omezō and Yaozō from the British Museum
- 1801 print by Toyokuni featuring Omezō and Yaozō
