= View of Tenpōzan Park in Naniwa =

Japanese artwork by Gochōtei Sadamasu

View of Tempōzan Park in Naniwa
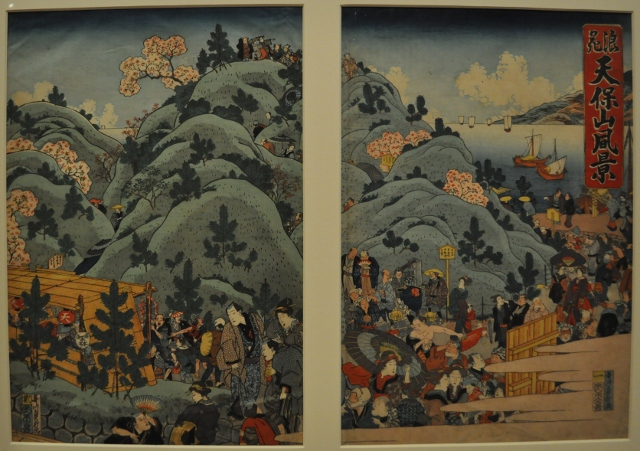
- View of Tempōzan Park in Naniwa by Gochōtei Sadamasu, panels 1–2 of 4
- Artist: Gochōtei Sadamasu
- Year: c. 1833
- Type: nishiki-e woodblock print, ink and color on paper
- Dimensions: 36.8 cm × 25.4 cm (14.5 in × 10 in)
- Condition: on display (November 2013– )
- Location: Royal Ontario Museum, Toronto
- Owner: Royal Ontario Museum
- Accession: 974.343.7a-b

The two ukiyo-e woodblock prints making up View of Tempōzan Park in Naniwa are half of a tetraptych by Osaka artist Gochōtei Sadamasu (fl. c. 1832–52). They depict a scene of crowds visiting Mount Tempō in springtime to admire its natural beauty. The sheets belong to the permanent collection of the Royal Ontario Museum, Canada.

== Print details ==
- Medium: kamigata nishiki-e (上方錦絵) woodblock print; ink and colour on paper
- Size: chūban
- Format: tate-e, sheets 1 and 2 of tetraptych
- Genre: fūkeiga
- Japanese title: Naniwa Tempōzan fūkei (浪花天保山風景)
- Exhibit title: View of Tempōzan Park in Naniwa
- Inscription: none
- Signature: Utagawa Sadamasu ga (歌川貞升画) in rectangular cartouche
- Publisher's mark: 天喜 (Tenki)
- Publisher's seal: 天 (Tenki)
- Censor seal: none
- Date seal: none
- Credit line: none

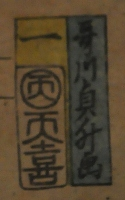
r to l: Utagawa Sadamasu ga/ ichi (1)/ Tenki

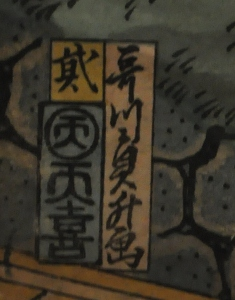
r to l: Utagawa Sadamasu ga/ ni (2)/ Tenki

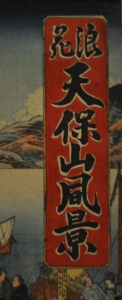
Naniwa/ Tempozan fukei

=== Artist ===
Gochōtei Sadamasu (五蝶亭貞升) (n.d.) was a prominent Osaka-based producer of ukiyo-e prints during the first half of the nineteenth century. Not much is known about his personal details, but he is known to have studied with Utagawa Kunisada in Edo. He was not a professional artist, but instead a moneyed landowner who used his wealth to support other Osaka print-makers directly and by opening a school of print design. Sadamasu is more commonly referred to as Utagawa Kunimasu (歌川 国升), the name he officially adopted in 1848.

=== Publisher ===
Both panels bear publisher's marks associated with Tenki. The seal is a stylized version of the character 天 (ten) contained within a circle. This appears directly above the full characters for Tenki (天喜). Operating under the firm name Kinkadō (金華堂), Tenki, or Tenmaya Kihei (天満屋喜兵衛) as it was also known, was an active publishing house from 1816 into the 1850s. Ukiyo-e scholar Andreas Marks notes that the seal version appearing in View of Tempōzan Park in Naniwa was used by Tenki on prints from 1826 to 1838.

=== Medium ===
As Sadamasu was born and for the most part based in Osaka, his works belong to the genre known as kamigata-e (上方絵). This term was used to distinguish prints produced in Kyoto and Osaka— a region then known as Kamigata— from those originating in Edo. Having come to prominence approximately a century after the emergence of ukiyo-e in Edo, the kamigata-e genre was predominantly devoted to kabuki-e, images of kabuki actors on and off stage. Another differentiating characteristic of kamigata-e is the fact that they were produced in the main not by professional studio artists, but by amateur “talented kabuki fans” seeking to memorialize and promote their dramatic heroes.

=== Genre ===
The red rectangular cartouche occupying the upper right corner of the first panel reads: Naniwa/ Tempōzan fūkei. This title clearly identifies the tetraptych series as belonging to the landscape genre of ukiyo-e prints, known as fūkeiga. In the early years of ukiyo-e, landscapes were not a popular subject, being a “far less dominant” genre than images of actors, beauties or everyday life scenes. In early prints, landscape was “a prop” or backdrop to the human content of the picture. As art historian Tadashi Kobayashi notes, “Landscape ukiyo-e prints by their very nature usually reflect the artist’s conception of natural settings as a stage upon which human scenes are enacted.” This is evident in these two prints by Sadamasu, where the landscape provides the impetus and scene for the human action dominating the image.

By the end of the first half of the nineteenth century, landscapes had “eclipsed” bijinga, shunga and kabuki-e as the major strain of ukiyo-e. Partly as a result of the increasing influence of western art, landscape became a pictorial theme in and of itself, such that Hiroshige had established himself by the mid-1830s as a producer of landscape prints.

=== Format ===
The prints are vertical tate-e sheet-prints, and comprise the first and second panels of a tetraptych. As Japanese prints of the Edo period were read from right to left, they represent the two right-hand panels of the four-panel set. They are numbered with the kanji characters 一 (1) and 貳 (2) in black ink within yellow squares at the top of the left-side column of the rectangular seal and signature cartouches.

=== Size ===
Each of the two sheets is cut to the ōban (大判) size, which typically measures approximately 39 cm by 27 cm. This was the most prevalent format for colour ukiyo-e prints after 1780, particularly among Edo print-makers. This size was supplanted in kamigata-e by the smaller chūban (中判) format—approximately 18 cm by 25 cm—from 1847 on, due in large part to Sadamasu's promotion of the smaller size among local artists.

=== Subject ===
The prints depict a scene of crowds visiting Tempōzan Park in Naniwa, the former name for present-day Osaka. Tempōzan—literally Tempō (era) mountain—was an approximately 20-meter high man-made hill created in 1831 (year 2 of the Tempō era) through the dredging of the adjacent Ajigawa River. It was intended to improve ship access to the port and help prevent flooding. The mound also served as a marker for ships, earning it the nickname "Landmark Mountain" mejirushi yama (目印山) among local sailors.

After pine and cherry trees were planted on its slopes, Tempōzan drew increasing numbers of visitors, particularly in spring when it was customary to participate in o-hanami (お花見) cherry blossom viewing. As it developed into a popular leisure spot, kakechaya (掛茶屋) tea houses and cafes sprang up to service the crowds. Sadamasu's print offers a panoramic view of Tempōzan crowded with visitors partaking in o-hanami. The mountain is encircled by a stone wall and bounded on the other side by the bay and port. The scene is lively, packed with figures whom Sadamasu depicts in considerable detail. Those depicted fall into various social ranks and classes including courtesans and geisha, samurai, servants, hawkers and chōnin townspeople. It provides a graphic example of what Calza describes as "the life and social whirl" of the Edo period.

== Other copies ==
- A copy of Sadamasu's complete Tempōzan tetraptych is preserved in the collection of the Osaka Prefectural Archives.
- Another version of the tetraptych on permanent view is a large-scale tiled mural copy of the complete work within the grounds of Tempōzan Park in Osaka.

== Other works related to Tempōzan ==
- Moonlit Night at Suehiro Bridge [天保山末廣橋月夜] (1830s) from the series Famous Places of Naniwa (Osaka), Views of Tempōzan at a Glance [浪花名所天保山景勝一覧] by Yashima Gakutei
- Tempōzan at the Mouth of the Aji River in Settsu Province [摂州阿治川口天保山] (1827–30) from the series Remarkable Views of Bridges in Various Provinces [諸国名橋奇覧] by Katsushika Hokusai
- Osaka Tempōzan [大坂天保山] (1859) from the series One Hundred Views of Famous Places in the Provinces [諸国名所百景] by Utagawa Hiroshige II
- Storm in Tempōzan Harbour [大阪天保山夕立の景] (1834) from the series Fine Views of Tempōzan in Osaka [天保山勝景一覧] by Yashima Gakutei

== See also ==
- Utagawa Kunimasu
- Mount Tenpō
- Bust portrait of Actor Kataoka Ichizō I (Gochōtei Sadamasu II) - print in same gallery
- Female Ghost (Kunisada) - print in same gallery
- Unit 88-9 (Kiyomizu Masahiro) - sculpture in same gallery
- Fan print with two bugaku dancers (Kunisada) - print in same collection
- Ichikawa Omezō as a Pilgrim and Ichikawa Yaozō as a Samurai (Toyokuni I) - print in same gallery
- Eijudō Hibino at Seventy-one (Toyokuni I) - print in same collection
- Spring and autumn landscapes (Hara Zaishō) - scroll painting in same gallery
- Actor Arashi Rikan II as Osome (Ryūsai Shigeharu) - print in same collection
- Ryūsai Shigeharu - professional kamigata-e artist
- Two Actors in Samurai Roles (Gosotei Hirosada) - print in same collection
