= Hara school of painters =

Japanese painting atelier

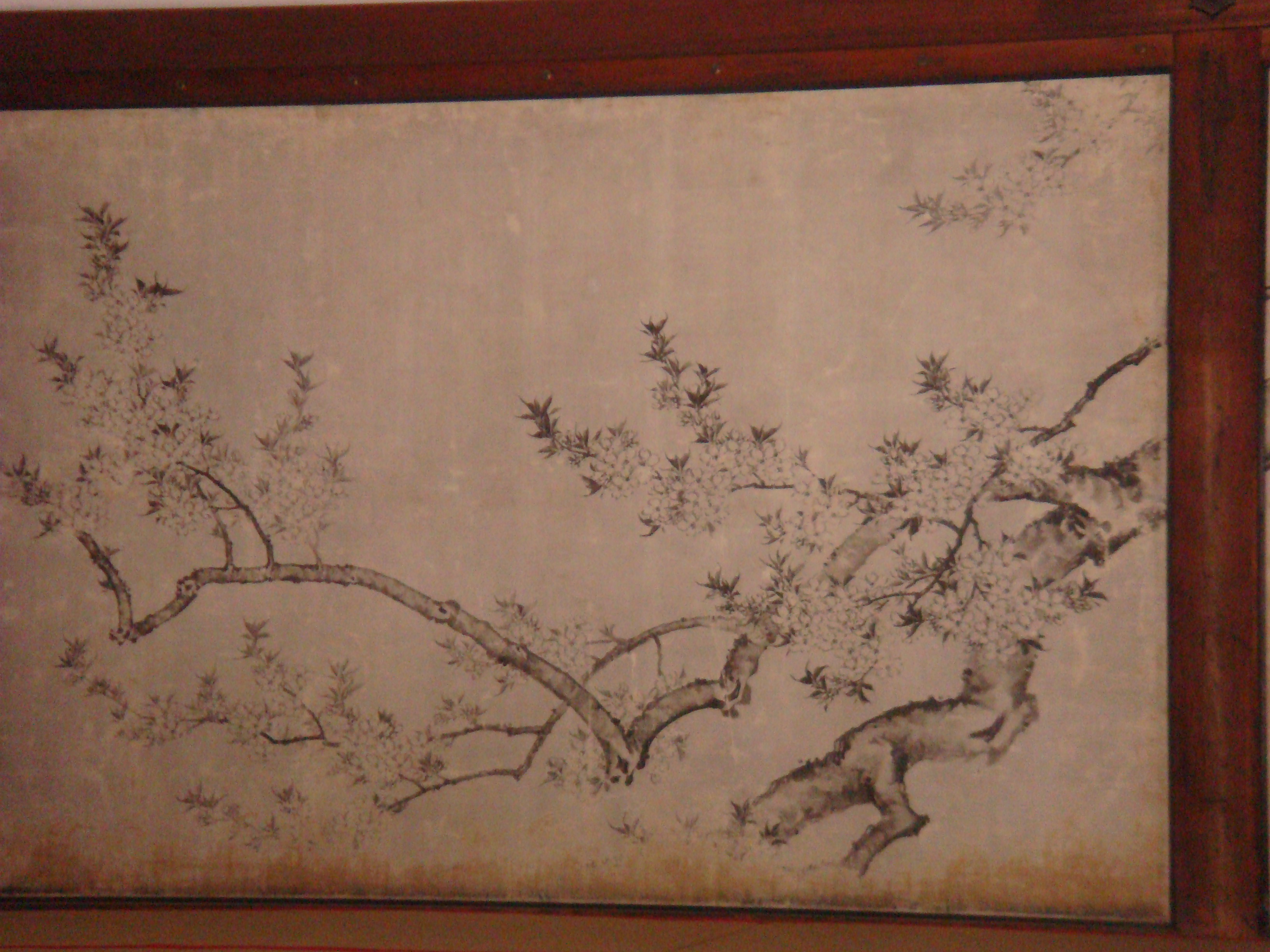
Kyoto Imperial Palace painting by Hara Zaichū

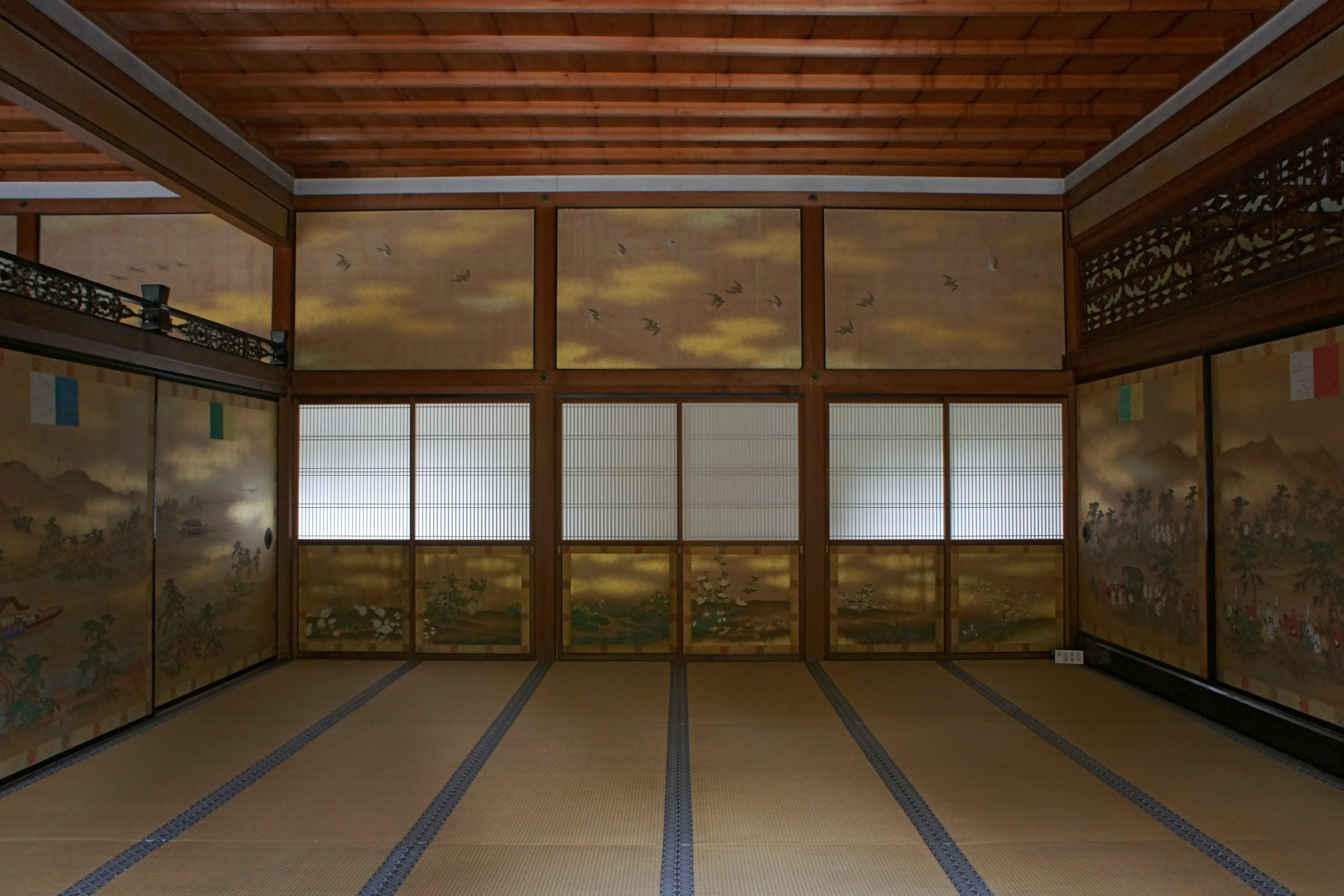
Paintings at Ninnaji Temple by Hara Zaisen

The Hara School was a Kyoto-based Japanese painting atelier established in the late Edo era, which continued as a family-controlled enterprise through the early 20th century. The Hara artists were imperial court painters and exerted great influence within Kyoto art circles. They contributed paintings to various temples and shrines, as well as to the Kyoto Imperial Palace.

== Late Edo period painting schools ==
Artistic production in Edo period Japan was dominated by schools, which were professional workshops organized along patriarchal lines. They had the twinned goals of training painters to faithfully continue school techniques, and of producing art to satisfy patrons. Art was largely the domain of private patrons and connoisseurs, its manufacture being commission-driven by nobles, daimyōs, temples and shrines. Only late in the nineteenth-century did art become accessible to the public, with the 1872 opening of Japan's first museum.

Schools were characterized by an extended family structure based on heredity through birth or adoption, and were modeled on the medieval guild system. Workshops also took inspiration from the edokoro, government-run painting offices. The late Edo atelier system had four features: the primacy of blood line, the hereditary transmission of skill from male to male, the positioning of the oldest male as single head, and alliances with other workshops through contract or marriage.

Artistic ability was defined as a combination of shitsuga (質画) and gakuga (学画): innate and learned painting skill. Pupils entered workshops as children, based not primarily on talent, but on status. Some studios strictly policed students' leisure activities, such as drinking and socializing, which was facilitated by the fact that pupils traditionally lived-in as uchi deshi. Study was a serious, time-consuming endeavor: "the successful student spent years in training, a time during which he developed physical stamina, self-discipline, perseverance, the ability to earn for himself, facility in technical skills, and a good understanding of the aesthetics and spiritual considerations required of a dedicated painter". Most studied for over ten years before being allowed to graduate, if they were allowed to graduate. Apprenticeship began with menial tasks and "unobtrusive observation". As pupils worked their way up to the rank of head students (deshi gashira), their relationship to their mentors was comparable to that of retainer to lord. Though seniors were usually referred to as sensei (teacher), some pupils addressed their instructors as tonosama, an honorific title for a feudal lord.

Though apprentices were there to learn, they also constituted a valuable labour pool, with their artistic output contributing financially to the school. Typically, the head would first outline in detail the overall composition, and pupils would then divide up the supplementary tasks. This benefited both school and patron, allowing the former to take on large scale commissions, and ensuring the latter timely completion of their orders under the ultimate accountability of the house head.

The methods of craft transmission were based on those established in China, and consisted of highly methodical copying of sample images until they could be adequately reproduced without looking at the model. This was practiced in a number of ways, including through use of edehon, "pictorial models containing sketches of such things as ideal forms, subjects, and objects that are copied repeatedly for study purposes in learning painting". This was employed ardently within the Kanō School, which wanted to ensure its tenets were not diluted through its wide network of painters. Consistency was also attempted through written manuals detailing such trade secrets as pigments and brush technique.

== Head artists of the Hara school ==
	Primary name	Dates	Birth name	Azana/ Gō/ Alternate names
1	Hara Zaichū (原在中)	1750–1837	Chien (致遠)	Shijū (子重), Gayū (臥遊)
2	Hara Zaimei (原在明)	1778–1844	Chikayoshi (近義)	Shitoku (子徳), Shashō ( 写照)
3	Hara Zaishō (原在照)	1813–1872		Shisha (子写), Kanran (観瀾), Nankei (南荊), Yūran (夕鸞)
4	Hara Zaisen (原在泉)	1849–1916		Shikon (子混), Shōtō (松濤)
5	Hara Zaikan (原在寛)	1884–1957		Shoun?
6	Hara Arinao (原在修)	b. 1922		

== Hara Zaichū ==
=== Biography ===
Hara Zaichū was born Hara Chien (致遠) in 1750 in Kyoto, where he lived throughout his life. Although his family were sake brewers, Zaichū followed his passion for art. He studied the painting techniques of the then dominant Kanō School under master painter Ishida Yutei (石田幽汀) (1721–86) and was instructed in Buddhist painting by Yamamoto Tan'en (山本探淵) (d. 1816). Zaichū also took advantage of access to Ming period Chinese paintings in the collections of some Kyoto shrines and temples.

Zaichū studied alongside Maruyama Ōkyo (円山応挙) (1733–95), who was to become one of the most influential artists of the Edo period and start his own painting school. There is some question as to whether Zaichū was Maruyama's pupil. Following Maruyama's death, Zaichū claimed not to have been, but this was disputed by Maruyama School members, most notably Zaichū's rival Kishi Ganku. Many modern biographies describe Zaichū as the "student" and Maruyama as his "teacher". Regardless, Zaichū was strongly influenced by Maruyama, as well as by the Kanō and the Tosa school styles. From these varied influences, Zaichū founded the Hara School in the mid-1770s.

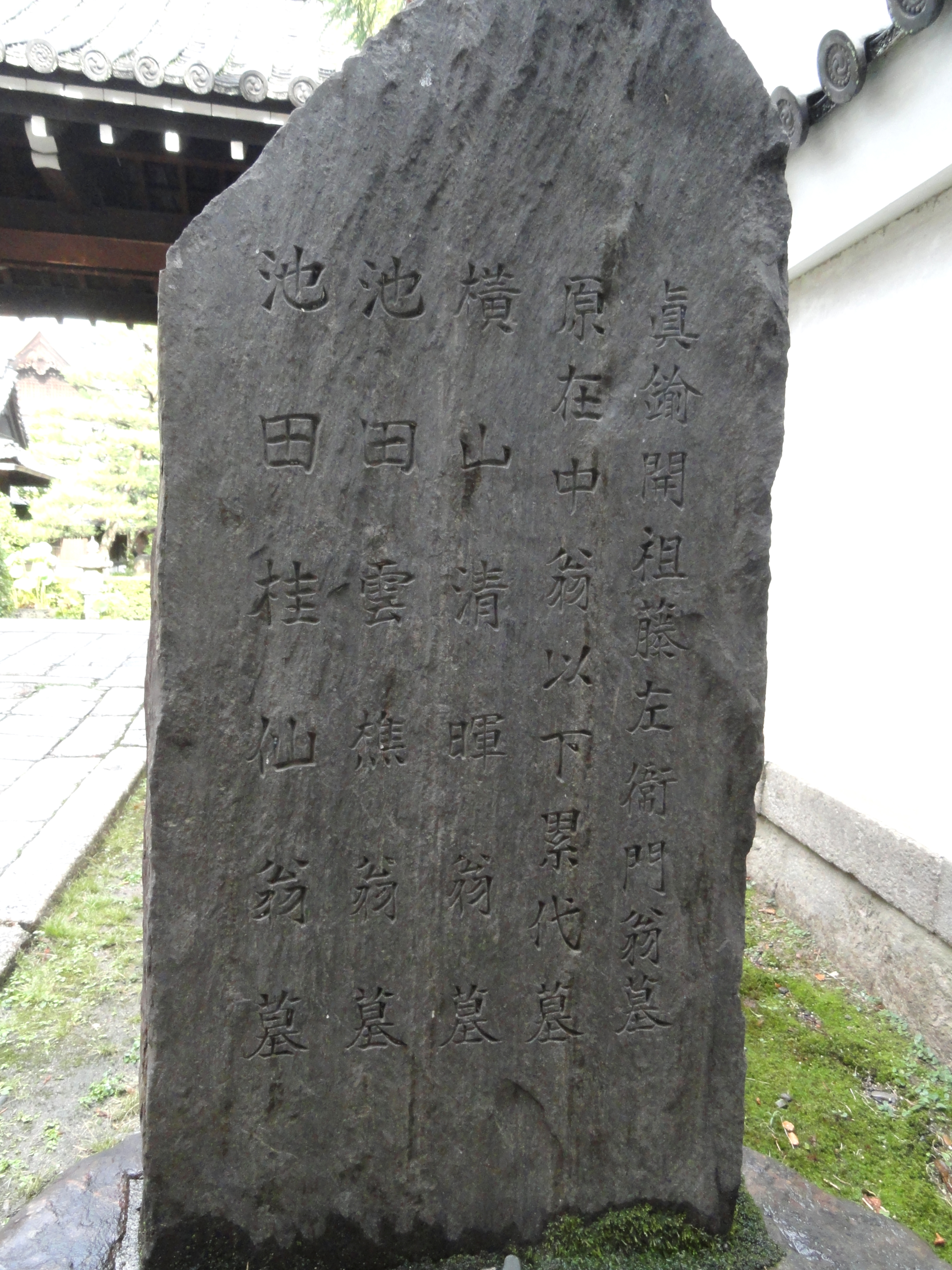
Hara Zaishō's Tenshōji grave marker (2nd name from right)

Zaichū was a prominent figure in the Kyoto art world, and an official court artist. So strong was his court affiliation that he earned the moniker Kyūtei-ha (宮廷派), reflecting his status as a court representative. His name appeared in all five editions of the Heian jinbutsushi, a "Who's Who" of Kyoto, from 1775 through 1830.

All four of his sons went on to become professional painters. The three eldest, Zaisei (原在正), Zaimei (原在明) and Zaizen (原在善), joined the Hara atelier. His youngest, Zaishin, was adopted into the Umeto family and worked under the name Umeto Zaishin (梅戸在親). Zaichū remained active and his skill undiminished until his death in 1837. He is buried on the grounds of Kyoto's Tenshōji Temple (天性寺).

=== Style ===
Thematically, his repertoire was diverse, including landscapes, portraits, plants and flowers, animals, Buddhist scenes (仏画), and gods (神像). He was considered particularly expert at court scenes, as well as landscapes and nature scenes. When construction began on Kyoto's Imperial Palace in 1790, Zaichū joined artists from the Tosa and Kanō schools to contribute several paintings. He also produced fusuma-e (sliding door paintings) for Kyoto temples such as Ninnaji (仁和寺), Kenninji (建仁寺), Shōgoin ( 聖護院) and Shōkokuji (相國寺). He worked in various scales and media, from small emaki (絵巻) handscrolls, kakemono (掛け物) hanging scrolls, and ema (絵馬) wooden prayer boards, to large fusuma-e (襖絵).

The Hara style tends to be described relative to other styles, for example as "lying somewhere between the orthodox Kanō, Chinese literati and Maruyama styles". Critics identify his work as delicate and decorative, as well as precise, balanced and elegant. In comparison with many of his contemporaries, he was less inclined toward realism and drama. As a result, his works are considered "rather quiet and low key", or even characterized by "stiffness", yet "admirably suited to the needs of the court".

=== Critical assessment ===
Many of Zaichū's paintings were stored in prominent Kyoto temples frequented mainly by the nobility. As a result, his works were not available to the public, which some argue has negatively affected his reputation. In addition to despairing of Zaichū's works' "blandness", some modern critics have challenged his status as an important artist, arguing that his works are essentially imitations of older Chinese and Japanese paintings rather than original, creative pieces. Others acknowledge his use of prototypes, but suggest that his works demonstrate a "characteristic Japanese dynamism". Zaichū, for the record, acknowledged his indebtedness to existing works: on some paintings, instead of signing his name, he wrote captions identifying the pieces as "copies" or as being "after" a given artist.

=== Works ===
In addition to those on display in the Kyoto Imperial Palace, paintings by Zaichū can be seen at the Kyoto National Museum (京都国立博物館), Shizuoka Museum (静岡県立美術館), Iida City Museum (飯田市美術博物館), Daitokuji Temple, Ikkyūji Temple (一休寺), and Shōkokuji Temple (相国寺). Outside Japan, the British Museum holds one of his paintings.

== Hara Zaimei ==
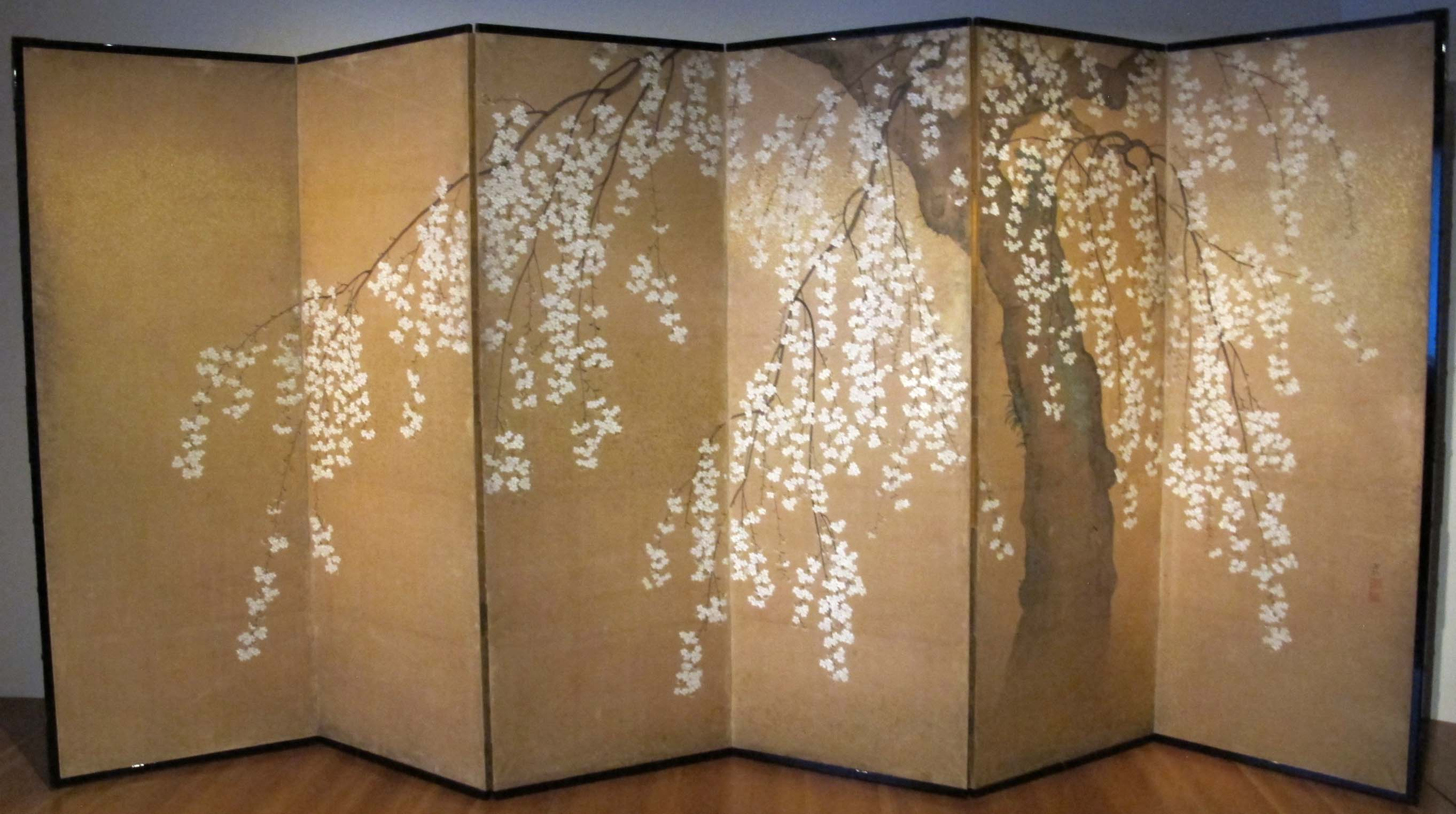
Painted screen by Hara Zaimei

Born in 1778, Zaimei was the second son of Hara Zaichū. He studied painting under his father, whom he succeeded as second head of the Hara academy after the death of his older brother. He was particularly skilled at painting classical court scenes. Under Zaimei, the Hara School was selected to head the official painting atelier attached to Nara's Kasuga Shrine, a relationship which continued throughout successive Hara generations. Zaisen died in 1844 and was buried within the Tenshōji Temple precinct.

Among his most notable works is the Iwashimizu Hachimangu festival scroll (石清水臨時祭礼図巻), which depicts a festival procession at a major Kyoto shrine. His works are also in the Boston Museum of Fine Arts and the British Museum.

== Hara Zaishō ==
Born in 1813, Zaishō was active during the late Edo and early Meiji periods. It was a time of great change within Japan due to its 1854 opening to the West. He was brought into the Hara family as Zaichū's adopted son and went on to become the third head of the school. As an imperial painter, he was promoted to Senior Sixth Rank Upper (正六位上), an aristocratic position within the court ranks.

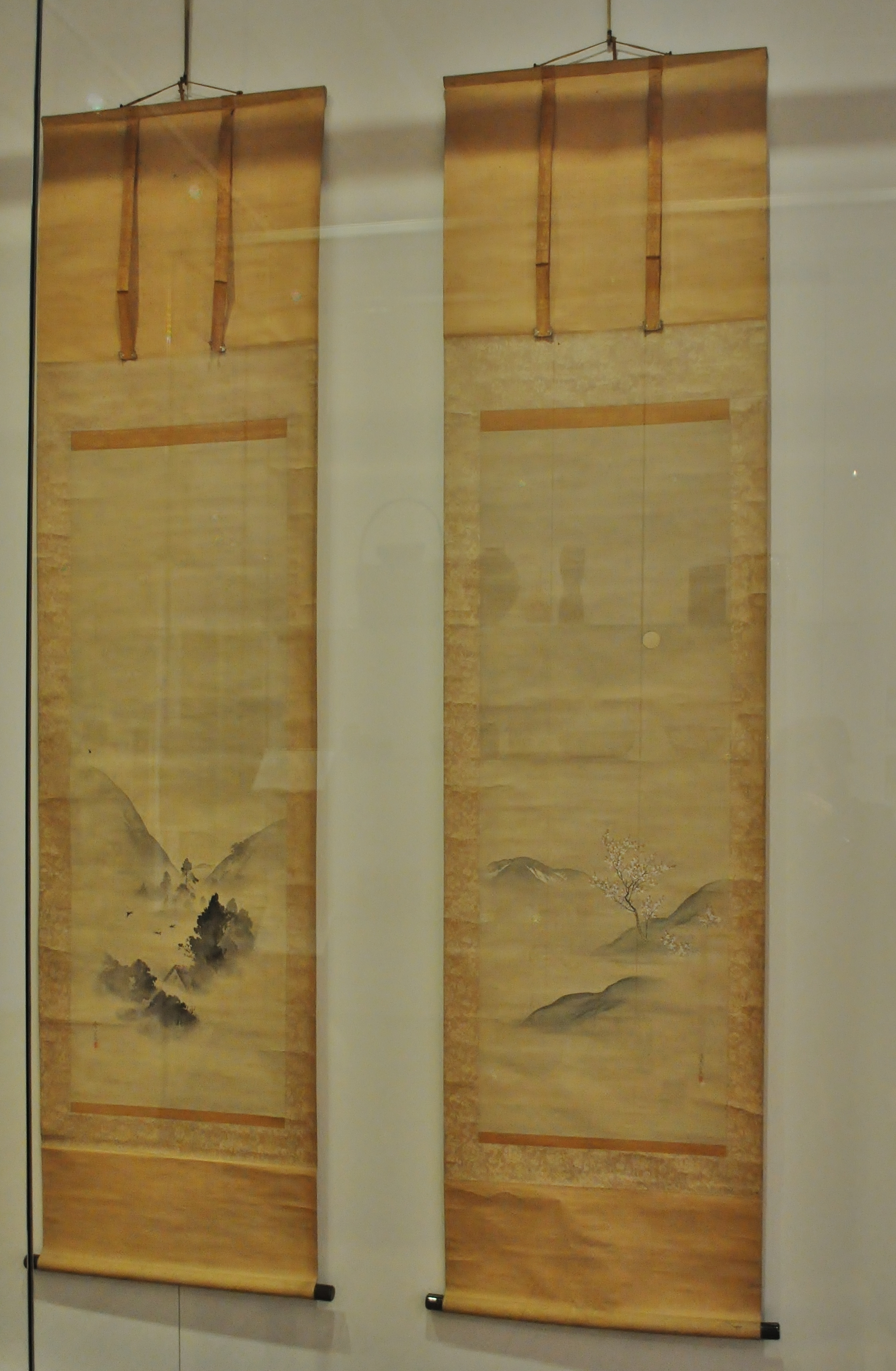
Spring and autumn landscapes by Hara Zaishō

He contributed pieces to the Kyoto Imperial Palace during its reconstruction subsequent to a fire in 1854, one of the most famous being a cherry tree fusuma-e in the Sakura-no-ma (Cherry Blossom Room). He died at 59 in 1872, and was buried at Tenshōji Temple. Today, his works can be seen in the Kyoto Imperial Palace, the Kyoto National Museum and the British Museum.

== Hara Zaisen ==
Zaisen was born in 1849 with the surname Watanabe, and his name changed to Hara at age 9 when he was adopted by Hara Zaishō. His career spanned the Meiji and Taishō periods, a time of great modernization and westernization in Japan. He became fourth head of the Hara academy in 1862 at just 13 years of age.

Zaisen was highly active in the Kyoto art world, In 1867, he was selected to represent Japan at the Paris International Exposition. In 1880, he became one of 43 shusshi (appointee) instructors at the Kyoto Prefectural School of Painting (京都府画学校), where he continued to teach until 1894. From early Meiji on, Zaisen was a committee member in art associations such as the Joun-sha and the Kōso Kyōhai, which organized meetings and competitions. From 1882 through the 1890s, he participated in a number of Domestic Painting Competitions (Naikoku Kaiga Kyoshinkai), at which he won several awards.

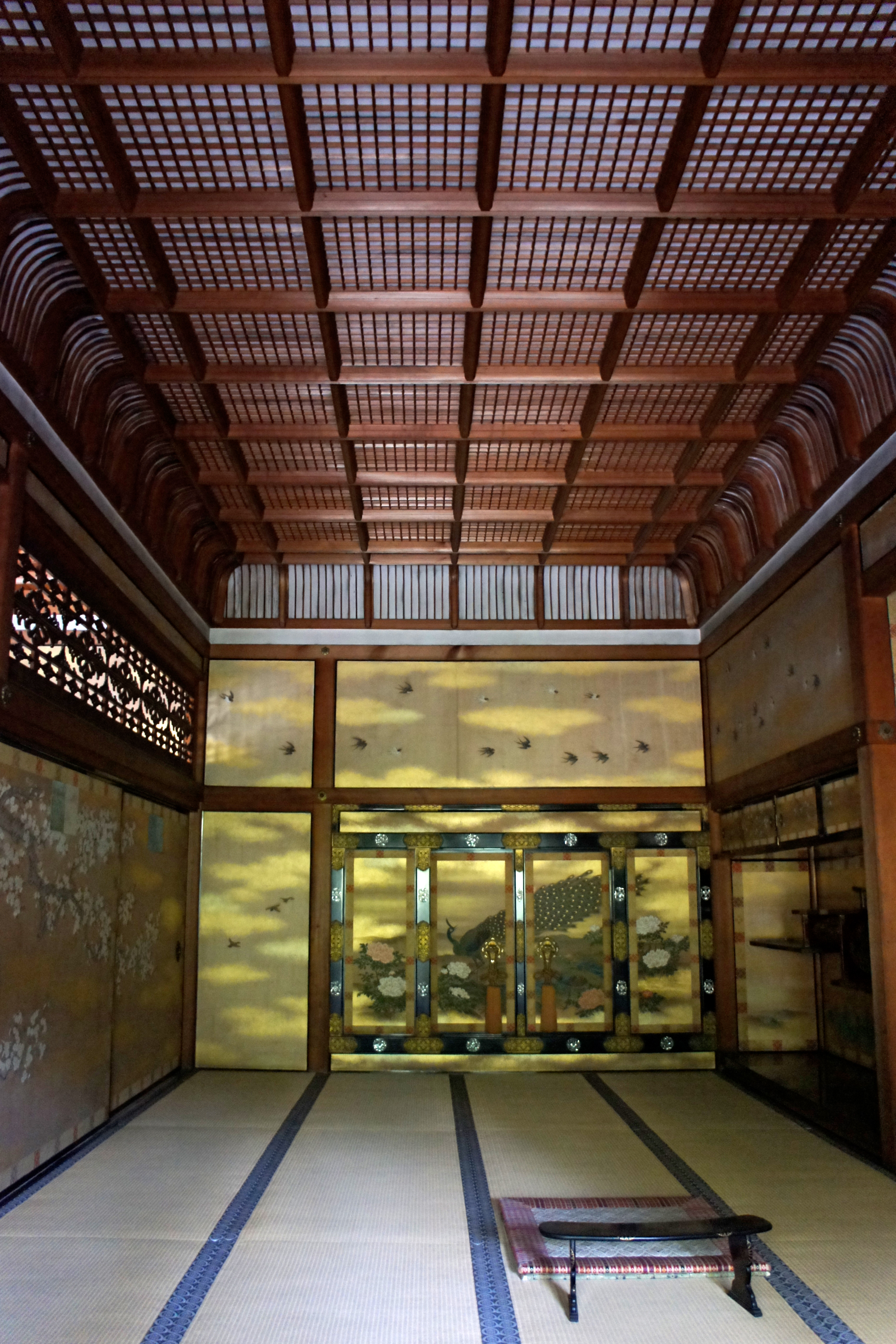
Paintings at Ninnaji by Hara Zaisen

Zaisen was a master painter of Yamato-e (大和絵), and an expert at ancient court scenes. He has been referred to as the last imperial court painter, and, like previous Hara heads, Zaisen was commissioned to decorate the Kyoto Imperial Palace. He also worked on occasion for the Imperial Household Office. In 1887, he contributed a fusuma-e of a pine tree. Other famous works include paintings in the Shinden at Ninnaji Temple done in 1913, which have been praised for their impressive and refined seasonal landscapes. He is also celebrated for a scroll completed in 1912 to commemorate the Meiji emperor's death. Zaisen died in 1916 aged 68.

Works from his oeuvre are in the collections of the Kyoto Municipal Museum of Art (京都市美術館), the Museum of Fine Arts Boston, and the Kyoto National Museum among others. Documents linked to Zaisen are in the collection of the Kyoto Prefectural Library and Archives.

== Hara Zaikan ==
Zaikan was born in Kyoto in 1884. He was the second son of Hara Zaisen, whom he succeeded as fifth head of the Hara School. As well as studying under his father, he attended the Kyoto Municipal School of Painting (京都市立美術工芸学校), from which he graduated in 1902. He was strongly inclined toward self-study, specializing in landscapes and images of flora and fauna. He assisted his father on paintings commissioned for Ninnaji Temple until their completion in 1914. In 1936, he assisted in the organization of an exhibition to mark the 100th anniversary of Hara Zaichū's death (在中百年忌遺墨展). Zaikan was acquainted with nobility and with the head priests of prestigious Kyoto temples, some of which now house a number of his works. He died in 1957 at 73.

== Hara Arinao ==
Hara Arinao was born in Kyoto in 1922. He studied Japanese style painting at the Kyoto Municipal College of Painting (京都市立絵画専門学校), until graduating in 1943. He next attended a naval prep school, before being demobilized as a naval first lieutenant. After the war, he worked at the Kyoto Evening News before joining Konnichian Urasenke, a large organization promoting the Way of Tea. He succeeded Hara Zaikan as sixth head of the Hara School.

== Other disciples ==
=== Hara Zaisei (原在正) ===
The eldest son of Hara Zaichū, he was born in 1777. He studied under his father, whose technique he was said to have surpassed. He was also known by the pseudonyms Shiei (子栄), Shishin (子信) and Chidō (致道). In 1805, he left his father's atelier to take up residence near the Kyoto Imperial Palace after receiving a promotion in rank. Due to his early death in 1810 at 33, he was the only Hara member not to participate in the nineteenth-century Imperial Palace decoration.

=== Hara Zaizen (在善) ===
Born Hara Ariyoshi in or around 1785, Zaizen was the third son of Hara Zaichū. Like his brothers, Zaizen studied painting under his father and was active within the atelier. He also painted under the name Shishi (子至). Although his older brother Zaimei succeeded as Hara head, Zaizen was well known in Kyoto art and court circles. His name appears, for example, in the 1830 edition of the Heian Jinbutsushi. Today, his paintings can be seen at the Kyoto National Museum.

=== Umeto Zaishin (梅戸在親) ===
Zaishin was born in 1795, the fourth son of Hara Zaichū. In 1808, aged 13, Zaishin was required to leave the Hara family to become an adopted son within the aristocratically-connected Umeto family. He was associated with the pseudonyms Shimin (子民) and Bien (美延). Within the Kyoto rank system, he earned the elite position of Senior Fourth Rank Lower (正四位下), exceeding his nephew Zaishō by 7 levels. He was known for his subtle, tasteful style. Upon the death of Zaichū, he took charge of art for Daigoji Temple in Kyoto. He died in 1883 at 88.

=== Hara Zaigen (原在謙) ===
Zaigen was born in 1813, the biological son of Hara Zaimei. Rather than succeeding his father as the third head, however, Zaishō was adopted in and Zaigen took the surname Ōshima (大嶋). The reasons for this are unknown, as is the reason why Zaigen later returned to his birth family and again took the name Hara. He was also known by the names Shieki (子益) and Jōsai (靖斎). He was considered extremely skilled at painting horses and equestrian equipment. According to official Hara family documents in the Kyoto Prefectural Library and Archives, he earned the rank of umanoōjo (右馬大允), denoting his status as an official painter of the imperial stables. He died in Kyoto in 1883.

== See also ==
- Spring and autumn landscapes (Hara Zaishō)

== Bibliography ==
- 京都市 (City of Kyoto). "特別展「京都と近代日本画－文展・帝展・新文展100年の流れのなかで (Special Exhibition "Kyoto and Modern Nihonga: 100 Years of Art Sponsored by the Ministry of Education and the Imperial Academy of Art")." Accessed May 19, 2013
- Conant, Ellen P. "Tradition in Transition, 1868–1890." In Nihonga, Transcending the Past: Japanese-style Painting 1868–1968, edited by Ellen P. Conant, 15–24. New York: Weatherhill, 1995.
- Dai Nippon Printing Co. Ltd. "一休寺方丈襖・壁画47面." Accessed May 16, 2013
- Gerhart, Karen M. "Talent, Training and Power: the Kano Painting Workshop in the Seventeenth Century." In Copying the Master and Stealing his Secrets: Talent and Training in Japanese Painting, edited by Brenda G. Jordan and Victoria Weston, 9–30. Honolulu: University of Hawaiʻi Press, 2003.
- Harada, Heisaku. "Joun-sha." In Nihonga, Transcending the Past: Japanese-style Painting 1868–1968, edited by Ellen P. Conant, 76–77. New York: Weatherhill, 1995.
- Iida City Museum. "原在中「後赤壁図」." Accessed May 18, 2013
- Imperial Household Agency. "主な展示資料 (Exhibition Highlights)." Accessed May 19, 2013
- Ishida Taiseisha Co., Ltd. "原在修 原派." Accessed May 15, 2013
- 時代統合情報システム. (Jidai tōgō jōhō system)"原在中 : はらざいちゅう : HARA ZAICHUU." Accessed May 19, 2013
- 時代統合情報システム (Jidai tōgō jōhō system). "Heian Jonibutsushi Bunsei 13 nen (Heian Jinbutsushi 1830)." Accessed May 18, 2013
- Jordan, Brenda G. "Copying From Beginning to End: Student Life in the Kanō School." In Copying the Master and Stealing his Secrets: Talent and Training in Japanese Painting, edited by Brenda G. Jordan and Victoria Weston, 31–59. Honolulu: University of Hawaiʻi Press, 2003.
- Kaikodo. "Hara Zaichu (1750–1837) 'The Five Hundred Arhats at T'ien-t'ai.'" Accessed May 12, 2013
- Kono, Motoaki. "The Organization of the Kanō School of Painting." Fenway Court 1992: Competition and Collaboration: Hereditary Schools in Japanese Culture, 18–29. Boston: Isabella Stewart Gardner Museum, 1993.
- Kurashiki City Art Museum. "原在謙 (Hara Zaigen)." Accessed May 19, 2013
- 京都市立芸術大学芸術資料館 (Kyoto City University of Arts Archives). "原在泉 (Hara Zaisen)." Accessed May 18, 2013
- 京都風光 (Kyotofukō). "仁和寺 (Ninnaji)." Accessed May 18, 2013
- Kyoto Museum of Fine Art. Painters in Kyoto of the late Edo and the Meiji Periods. (京都画壇 : 江戶末, 明治の画人たち). Kyōto: Kyōto-shi Bijutsukan, 1950.
- Kyoto Prefecture. "原在泉家文書 館古263 (Hara Zaisen Family Documents Item 263)." Accessed May 17, 2013
- Lillehoj, Elizabeth. "Glossary". In Critical Perspectives on Classicism in Japanese Painting, 1600–1700. s.v. "Edokoro," 217. Honolulu: University of Hawaiʻi Press, 2004.
- Martin, John H. and Phyllis G. Kyoto: A Cultural Guide. Tokyo: Tuttle Publishing, 2002.
- "Maruyama Okyo." Encyclopedia of World Biography. 2004.Encyclopedia.com. Accessed May 21, 2013
- なりひらてら 十輪寺 (Narihira Temple Jūrinji Temple). "なりひら寺 十輪寺 (Narihira Temple Jūrinji Temple)." Accessed May 19, 2013
- Rimer, J. Thomas. "An Afterward Posing as a Foreword: Some Comparative and Miscellaneous Thoughts on Talent and Training." In Copying the Master and Stealing his Secrets: Talent and Training in Japanese Painting, edited by Brenda G. Jordan and Victoria Weston, xvii–xxii. Honolulu: University of Hawaiʻi Press, 2003.
- 立命館大学アート・リサーチセンター (Ritsumeikan University Art Research Centre)."文化10年版(画) Bunka 10 edition (chart)." Accessed May 18, 2013
- Roberts, Laurance P. A Dictionary of Japanese Artists: Painting, Sculpture, Ceramics, Prints, Lacquer. s.v. "Hara Zaisen," 39. New York: Weatherhill, 1990.
- Sakakibara, Yoshio. "The Kyoto Prefectural Painting School and the Kyoto Municipal Special School of Painting." In Nihonga, Transcending the Past: Japanese-style Painting 1868–1968, edited by Ellen P. Conant, 84–85. New York: Weatherhill, 1995.
- Samurai Archives Citadel Japanese History Forum. "The Ritsuryo Ranks and Positions." Accessed May 19, 2013
- Sasaki, Jōhei, and Masako Sasaki. "The Formation and Development of Japanese Painting Schools." Fenway Court 1992: Competition and Collaboration: Hereditary Schools in Japanese Culture, 46–59. Boston: Isabella Stewart Gardner Museum, 1993.
- Shibunkaku Co., Ltd. "原在謙 (Hara Zaigen)." Accessed May 19, 2013
- Shibunkaku Co., Ltd. "梅戸在親 (Hara Zaishin)." Accessed May 17, 2013
- 菅井信夫(Sugai Nobuo). "仁和寺2・ 御殿 (Ninnaji 2 / Imperial Court)." Accessed May 19, 2013
- Suzuki, Yukito. "'An Art History'" in 1820: An Essay on the Screen Pictures of Sangen-in, Daitoku-ji Temple." Journal of the Graduate School of Letters, Hokkaido University, 1 (Feb. 2006): 53–67.
- Tazawa, Yutaka, ed. Biographical Dictionary of Japanese Art. s.v. "Hara Zaichū." Tokyo: Kodansha International Ltd., 1981.
- The British Museum. "Hara Zaichū, Tiger, a hanging scroll painting." Accessed May 23, 2013
- The Tokugawa Art Museum. "いわしみずはちまんりんじさいれいずかん(Iwashimizu Hachiman Shrine Festival Painting)." Accessed May 18, 2013
- Tokyo National Museum. "History of the TNM." Accessed May 21, 2013
