= Unit 88-9 (Kiyomizu Masahiro) =

Stoneware sculpture

- Artist: Kiyomizu Masahiro (Kiyomizu Rokubei VIII)
- Year: 1988
- Type: Stoneware sculpture
- Medium: Glazed stoneware
- Dimensions: 16.2 cm × 35.5 cm (6.4 in × 13.9 in)
- Condition: Not on display
- Location: Royal Ontario Museum, Toronto
- Owner: ROM
- Accession: 994.222.1

Unit 88-9 (Kiyomizu Masahiro) is a glazed stoneware sculpture by contemporary Japanese potter and sculptor Kiyomizu Masahiro, also known by the professional art-name Kiyomizu Rokubei VIII. This piece is held in the collection of the Royal Ontario Museum in Toronto, Canada.

== Kiyomizu Masahiro ==
Kiyomizu Masahiro (清水 柾博) was born in Kyoto on April 22, 1954. His father was the sculptor Kiyomizu Kyūbei (清水九兵衛), who in 1981 became the seventh head of the Kiyomizu pottery atelier and took the name Kiyomizu Rokubei VII.

Kiyomizu Masahiro graduated from Tokyo's Waseda University with a degree in architecture from the Faculty of Science and Engineering in 1979. Although he originally planned to pursue this field, he decided to follow in the family pottery tradition because it gave him "full control of the creative process from start to finish." He returned to Kyoto, where he continued his studies. He spent one year at the Kyoto Prefectural Ceramic Training Institute and another year at the Municipal Decorative Arts Institute in Kyoto.

In 1983, he became an official ceramist of the Kiyomizu family. In 2000, at age 46, he succeeded his father to become the eighth head of the Kiyomizu pottery studio. At this time, he took the name Kiyomizu Rokubei VIII. Since then, he has attempted to combine the 240 plus years of tradition of his family kiln with his own unique avant-garde style.

He is currently an instructor of Contemporary Ceramics at the Kyoto University of Art and Design (京都造形芸術大学). He describes the goal of his classes as, "not simply to learn the techniques required to make ceramics, but to learn how to use those skills to produce a beautiful form, to create the form you want to express, to create a form corresponding to a specific image." A technique he favours is joining flat slabs of clay in extended forms, highlighting instead of hiding the process of their construction. He then makes cuts to weaken the structure, which results in distortions during firing.

Kiyomizu Rokubei VIII is a member of the International Academy of Ceramics, the Japan Society of Oriental Ceramic Studies (東洋陶磁学会) and the Ceramic Society of Japan (日本陶磁協会). In a 2004 survey conducted by Japanese art magazine Honoho Geijutsu to determine Japan's most important living ceramists, Kiyomizu tied for 23rd place in the popular vote. He was ranked 12th by curators, critics and art journalists.

== Awards ==
Year	Award	Prize title
1983	Asahi Ceramics Exhibition (朝日陶芸展)	Grand Prix
1986	14th Chūnichi International Exhibition of Ceramic Arts (中日国際陶芸展)	Ministry of Foreign Affairs Award (外務大臣)
1986	Asahi Ceramics Exhibition (朝日陶芸展)	Grand Prix
1987	Kyoto City Artistic Newcomer Award (京都市芸術新人賞)	
1988	Yagi Kazuo Competition of Contemporary Ceramics (八木一夫賞)	Outstanding Performance Award (優秀賞)
1989	'89 Contemporary Ceramics Exhibition (現代陶芸展)	Yomiuri Prize (読売賞)
1992	3rd Next Artist Exhibition (第3回「次代を担う作家」展)	Grand Prize (大賞)
1993	Kyoto Prefectural Culture Award (京都府文化賞)	Encouragement Award (奨励賞)
1997	Sidney Myer Fund International Ceramic Award (シドニー・マイヤー基金国際陶芸賞展)	
1999	Takashimaya Art Prize (タカシマヤ美術賞)	
2005	The Ceramic Society of Japan Prize (日本陶磁協会賞)	
2009	Kyoto Prefectural Culture Award (京都府文化賞)	Meritorious Service Award (功労賞)

== Unit 88-9 ==
Although the first heads of the Kiyomizu family concentrated on traditional, popular objects and designs, Rokubei VII and VIII "took a radical turn" to produce abstract, geometric three-dimensional pieces which are either purely decorative, or combine function with distinctive, unexpected form. His works have been described as "futuristic-looking" and as having "a very Cubist sensibility." Unit 88-9 fits in well with this characterization. It is a polyhedral piece of sculptural stoneware, with multiple flat and curved surfaces. The top surface is concave and, like every other surface, is lacerated. It is monochromatic, being entirely dark brown.

== Other works ==
Rokubei VIII's pieces belong to the following collections:

- British Museum
- National Art Museum of China
- Everson Museum of Art
- Sèvres National Ceramics Museum
- Kyoto Municipal Museum of Art
- Crafts Gallery of the National Museum of Modern Art, Tokyo
- National Museum of Art, Osaka

His large-scale 1972 steel sculpture Belt II stands in Paris' Museum of Outdoor Sculpture.

In 2005, he produced the ceramic art sculpture SKY RELATION - 2005 for the domestic terminal of Central Japan International Airport (中部国際空港).

== See also ==
- Royal Ontario Museum
- Spring and autumn landscapes (Hara Zaishō) - painting in same gallery
- Female Ghost (Kunisada) - print in same gallery
- Fan print with two bugaku dancers (Kunisada) - print in same gallery
- Ichikawa Omezō as a Pilgrim and Ichikawa Yaozō as a Samurai (Toyokuni I) - print in same gallery
- Eijudō Hibino at Seventy-one (Toyokuni I) - Print in same gallery
- Bust portrait of Actor Kataoka Ichizō I (Gochōtei Sadamasu II) - print in same gallery
- View of Tempōzan Park in Naniwa (Gochōtei Sadamasu) - print in same gallery
