= Female Ghost (Kunisada) =

Ukiyo-e print by Utagawa Kunisada, 1852

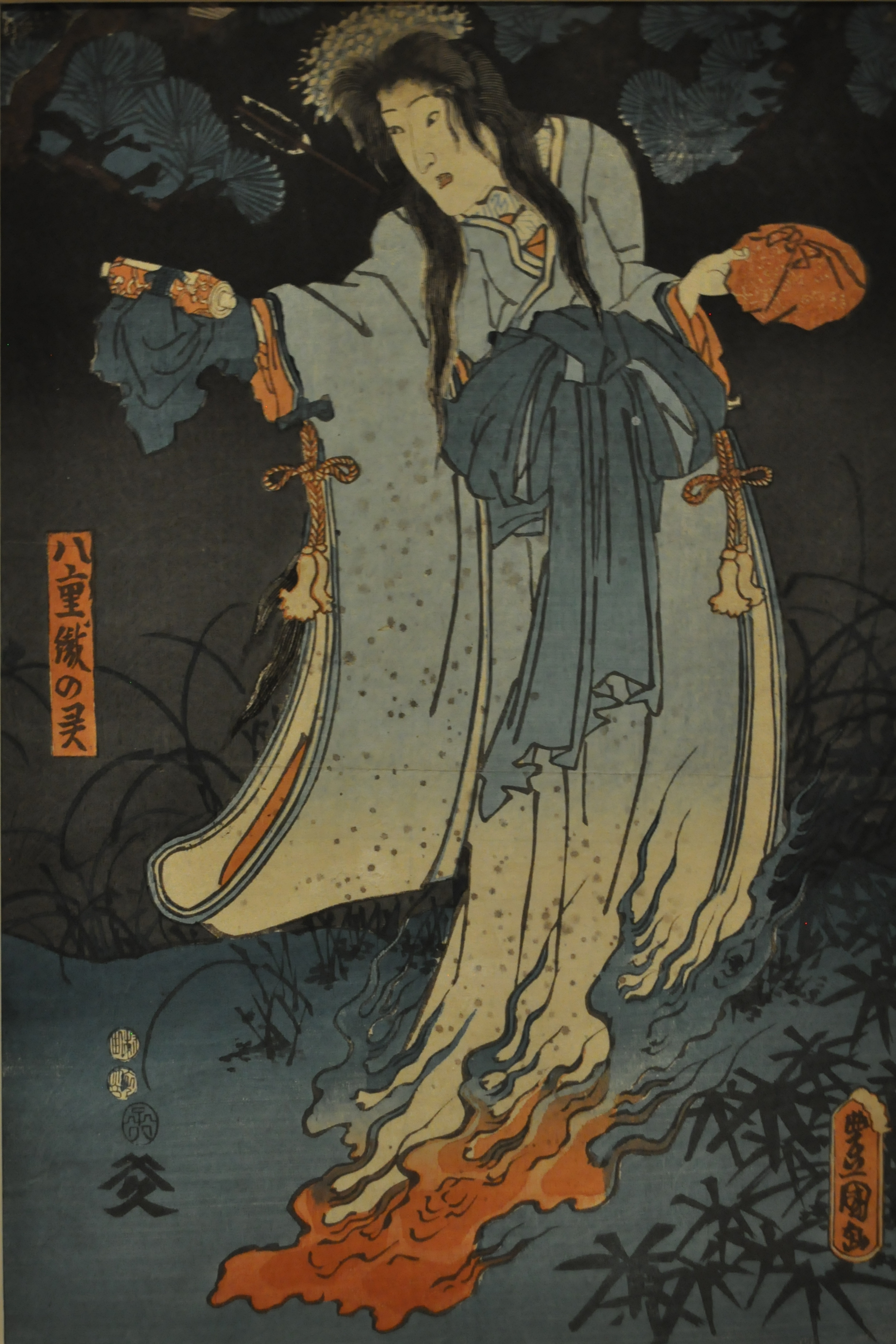
- Female Ghost, Utagawa Kunisada (Toyokuni III)
- Artist: Utagawa Kunisada (Toyokuni III)
- Year: 1852
- Type: ukiyo-e woodblock print
- Dimensions: 38 cm × 25.5 cm (15 in × 10 in)
- Condition: not currently on display
- Location: Royal Ontario Museum, Toronto
- Owner: Royal Ontario Museum
- Accession: 991.52.2

Female Ghost is an ukiyo-e woodblock print dating to 1852 by celebrated Edo period artist Utagawa Kunisada, also known as Toyokuni III. Female Ghost exemplifies the nineteenth century Japanese vogue for the supernatural and superstitious in the literary and visual arts. The print is part of the permanent collection of the Royal Ontario Museum, Toronto, Canada.

== Yūrei-zu ==
This print belongs to a genre of Japanese painting and ukiyo-e known as Japanese: 幽霊図, romanized: yūrei-zu, lit. 'ghost pictures', which peaked in popularity in the mid-nineteenth century. Literally 幽, yū, 'faint'-霊, rei, 'spirit', yūrei is just one of several Japanese words used to refer to spirits. Other terms include: お化け, obake; 妖怪, yōkai; 亡霊, bōrei; 死霊, shiryō/shirei; 幽鬼, yūki; 妖魔, yōma; 幽怪, yūkai; 霊, rei; 化け物, bakemono; 魂魄, konpaku; 変化, henge; 怨霊, onryō and 幽霊人口, yūreijinkō.

There is a long tradition of belief in the supernatural in Japan which relates to various influences, including such imported sources as Buddhism, Taoism and Chinese folklore. The most notable influence, however, is Shintō, a native animistic religion which presupposes that the physical world is inhabited by eight million omnipresent spirit beings.

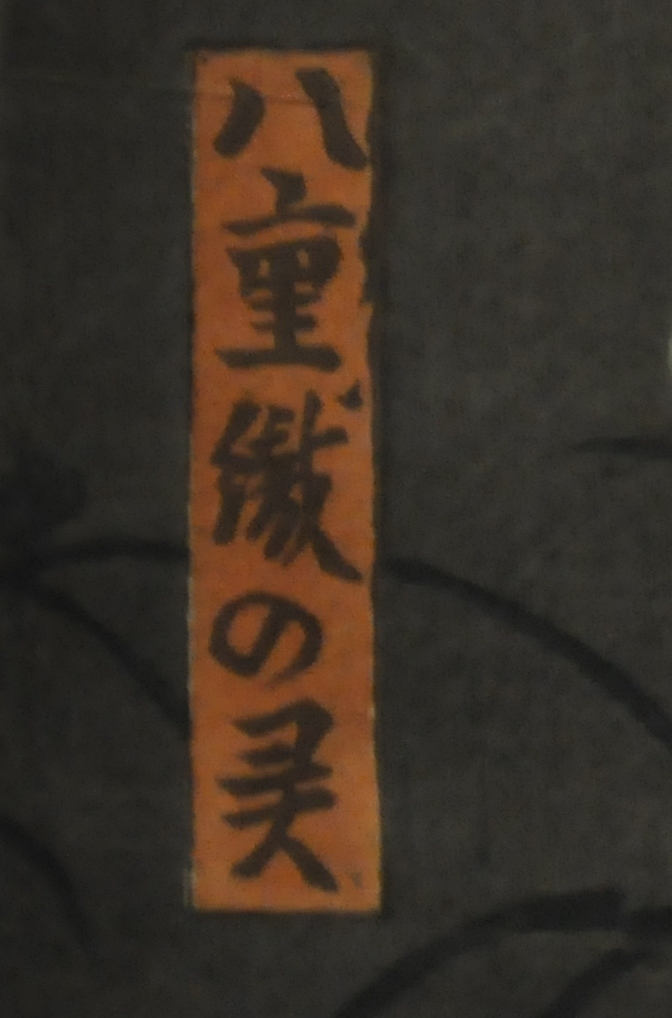
Kunisada Female Ghost print title cartouche

Yūrei-zu such as this one represent the conflation of two prevailing trends in the nineteenth century Japanese literary and visual arts: depictions of the female form, and depictions of macabre or supernatural themes. During this period, ghosts— particularly the female variety— commonly figured in folktales, as well as theatre. Vengeful spirits returning to punish their wrong-doers were a staple of kabuki, bunraku and nō dramas, and proved popular with audiences. Wishing to tap into this market for the macabre, painters and woodblock artists began to create images of ghosts, as well as of kabuki actors in the roles of ghost characters.

== Yakusha-e ==
Kunisada entered Utagawa Toyokuni's studio from a young age, and was therefore granted access to training from the finest masters of the age, as well as valuable connections to publishers, poets' associations, theatres and actors. He began creating yakusha-e (actor images) in 1808, and this genre was to become the mainstay of his fame and fortune. So esteemed and prolific was he in this area, that he earned the epithet "Kunisada, the Portraitist of Actors" (yakusha-e no Kunisada). The Tempō Reforms of 1842, which had banned depictions of geisha, oiran courtesans and kabuki actors, began to be gradually repealed from the late 1840s, which left Kunisada free to return to his favourite medium.

== Utagawa Kunisada (Toyokuni III) ==
Born in 1786 in the Honjō district of Edo, Utagawa Kunisada (歌川国貞) was an apprentice of Toyokuni I, whom he later succeeded as Toyokuni III (三代歌川豊国). Although he debuted as a book illustrator in 1807 with illustrations for the series of beauties "Twelve Hours of the Courtesans" (Keisei jūnitoki), his production and popularity began to increase in 1809. He founded his own studio in the early 1810s, and demand for his illustrations soon outstripped that for his master's. Not only was he respected for his artistic talent, he was also admired for his "convivial and balanced demeanor, and [the fact that] he delivered his commissions on time."

Kunisada has been described as "without a doubt...the most prolific and successful print artist of all time." Until the time of his death in 1865, he was incredibly prodigious, creating between 35 and 40 thousand designs for individual ukiyo-e prints. He produced images in diverse genres, including kabuki-e (pictures of kabuki actors), bijin-ga (pictures of beautiful women), yūrei-zu (ghost pictures), sumō-e (sumo wrestler pictures), shunga (erotica) and musha-e (warrior prints).

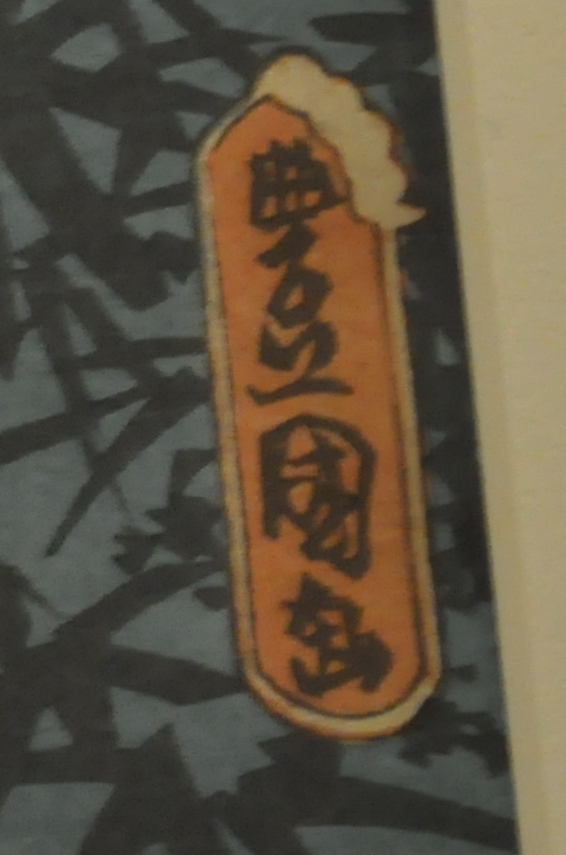
Kunisada signature from Female Ghost print

According to modern critics, Kunisada was "a trendsetter... in tune with the tastes of urban society." He is credited with infusing ukiyo-e with a sense of realism, particularly in his representations of female subjects. Compared with the women idealized in prints by Utamaro, his women are shorter limbed, with shorter and rounder physiques. They are often posed with "slightly bent backs and knees, giving them a hunched up, stumpy look." Like the female spirit in this print, they generally have longer faces with strong jaws, giving an impression of "greater self-possession, if not outright aggressiveness."

The print dates to 1852 and was therefore done when Kunisada was 66, before his work declined into what has been described as "gaudy and ostentatious" use of colour. Critics tend to agree that Kunisada's later works suffered in quality "because of over-production and lowering of artistic standards."

== Female Ghost ==
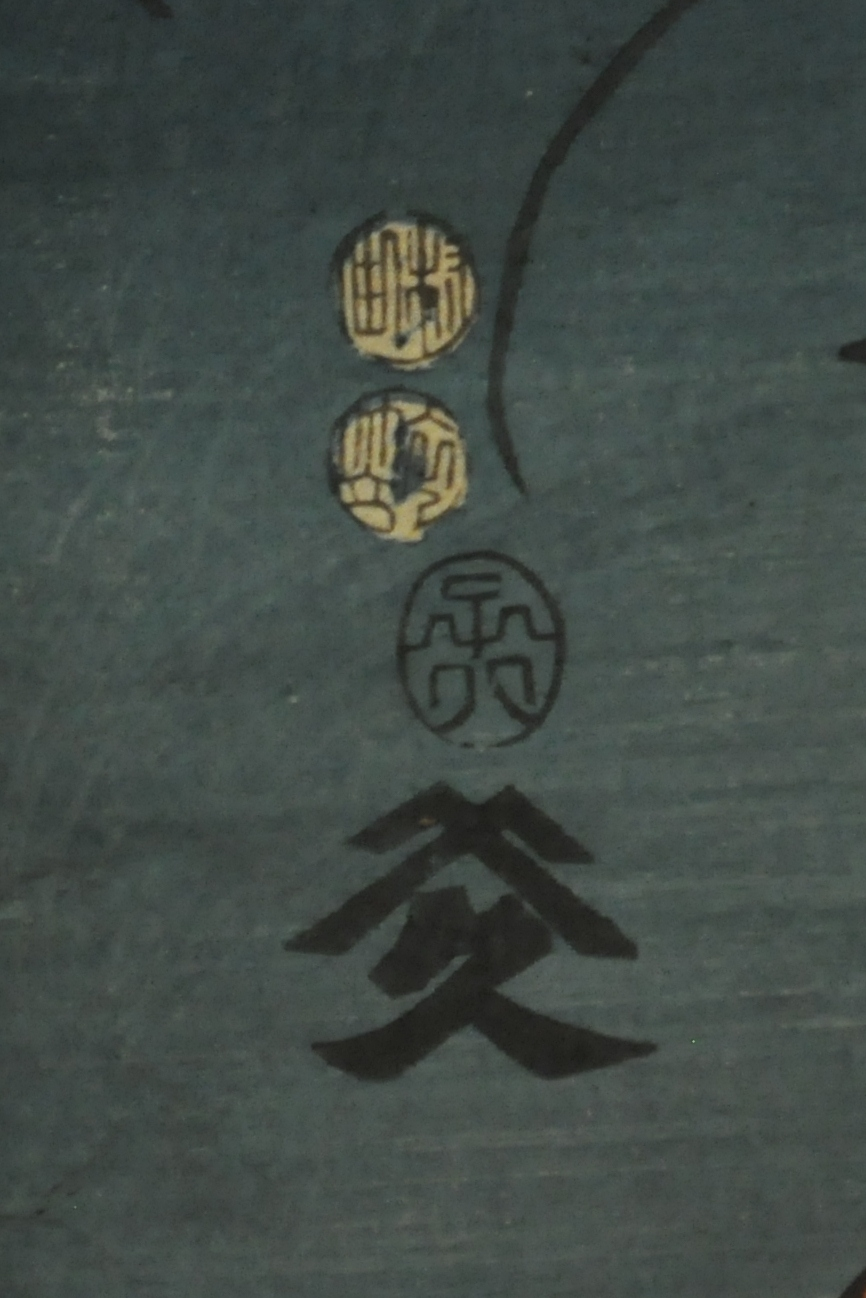
Nanushi, date and publisher's seals from Kunisada's Female Ghost

The subject in this print corresponds to the typical depiction of female ghosts in Edo art: "a fragile form with long, flowing hair... dressed in pale or white clothing, the body below the waist tapered into nothingness." The central area is dominated by the figure of a female spirit with extremely long, wildly flowing black hair, crowned by a pale blue and white decoration. Unlike in many other yūrei-zu, the ghost in this print is not disfigured or particularly ghoulish. She wears a long, pale blue kimono with the long sleeves (furisode - 振袖) common to the kimono of single women and female ghosts. Underneath are two inner robes, one solid red, and the other with a pale blue and white geometric design. Her kimono is fastened with a large dark blue obi tied in a disheveled bow at the front. Her kimono is closed left over right, as it would be worn by a living woman; in preparation for burial or cremation, kimono of the deceased are always closed right over left.

The ghost floats, footless and with arms bent up at the elbows, as is customary for ghost images of the period, in flames above a grassy field. Her head is framed by pine boughs. She stares off to the right, her gaze following her outstretched right arm. Covering the palm of her right hand is a blue cloth on top of which rests a rolled up kakemono or makimono scroll. In her left hand she grasps a red cloth—possibly a furoshiki—which is tied up as a round, flat parcel. Peaking out over her right shoulder is the brown feathered fletching of a single arrow.

The image dates to 1852, the most productive year of Kunisada's career, during which he produced almost one thousand compositions. The image depicts a scene from a kabuki play entitled 御伽譚博多新織, Otogi banashi Hakata no imaori, which was staged at Edo's Nakamura-za theatre in 1852. The image takes its original title from the character represented: 八重機姫の霊, Yaeki hime no rei, the ghost of Princess Yaeki. Although not named on the print, the character was played by actor Onoe Baikō (尾上梅幸).

Although it is displayed in isolation in the ROM, the print is actually the centre image from a triptych, capturing different characters from the play, which can be viewed online. The image on the left—to which her outstretched right arm appears to be reaching—is of Akamatsu Shigetamaru (赤松重太丸) as played by actor Ichikawa Kodanji (市川小団次). In the right of the triptych is another character from the play, named Nanakusa Shirō (七草四郎). The image belongs to a series of over twenty images depicting scenes from the play, including another of Yaeki hime no rei.

== Print details ==
- Size: ōban
- Format: tate-e
- Title: Yaeki hime no rei (八重機姫の霊); labelled Female Ghost by ROM
- Subject: Yaeki hime no rei (Ghost of Princess Yaeki), character from the kabuki play Otogibanashi Hakata no imaori
- Signature: Toyokuni ga (豊国画); in red oval toshidama-in cartouche, lower right corner
- Publisher: Yamamoto-ya Heikichi, Eikyūdō; dark blue hanmoto mark in bottom left corner
- Censor seals: 2 nanushi seals reading, top to bottom: Murata (村田) & Kinugasa (衣笠) indicating Murata Heiemon & Kinugasa Fusajiro
- Date seal: rat 6, i.e. 6th month of 1852; oval in lower left corner, below censor seals
- Genre: Yūrei-zu, yakusha-e
- Provenance: donated to the ROM by linguist and librarian Leonard Wertheimer (1914-1998)

== See also ==
- Princess Takamado
- Spring and autumn landscapes (Hara Zaishō) - items in same gallery
- Unit 88-9 (Kiyomizu Masahiro) - item in same gallery
- Eijudō Hibino at Seventy-one (Toyokuni I) - print in same collection
- Ichikawa Omezō as a Pilgrim and Ichikawa Yaozō as a Samurai (Toyokuni I) - print in same collection
- Fan print with two bugaku dancers (Kunisada) - print in same gallery
- Bust portrait of Actor Kataoka Ichizō I (Gochōtei Sadamasu II) - print in same gallery
- View of Tempōzan Park in Naniwa (Gochōtei Sadamasu) - print in same gallery
- Actor Arashi Rikan II as Osome (Ryūsai Shigeharu) - print in same gallery

== External sources ==
- http://www.rom.on.ca/en/exhibitions-galleries/galleries/world-cultures/prince-takamado-gallery-japan Webpage for the ROM's Price Takamado Gallery
- http://www.kunisada.de/ The Utagawa Kunisada Project Vast repository of information about Kunisada's works
- https://web.archive.org/web/20150430031233/http://www.enpaku.waseda.ac.jp/db/enpakunishik/results-1.php Images of prints from Kunisada's 1852 Otogi banashi Hakata no Imaori series
