= Spring and Autumn Landscapes =

Spring and autumn landscapes
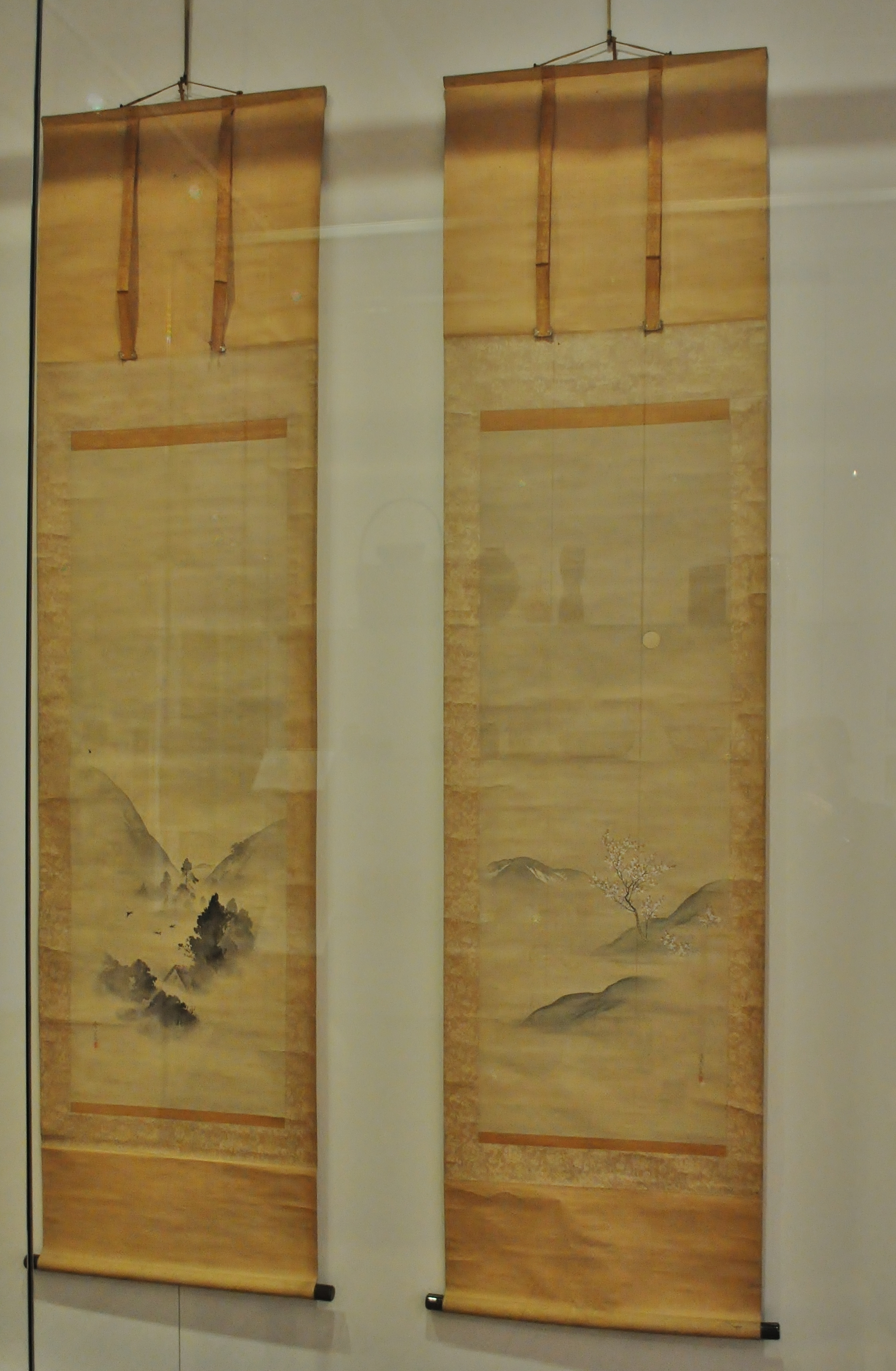
- Spring and autumn landscapes by Hara Zaishō
- Artist: Hara Zaishō
- Year: unknown
- Type: Ink and colours on silk
- Subject: seasonal landscapes
- Condition: Not on display
- Location: Royal Ontario Museum; Toronto; 43°40′4.07″N 79°23′43.81″W
- Owner: Royal Ontario Museum

Spring and autumn landscapes is a pair of paintings representing spring and autumn by Japanese artist Hara Zaishō (1813–1872). It is part of the permanent collection of the Royal Ontario Museum, Toronto, Canada.

== Hara Zaishō ==
Hara Zaishō (原在照) was the adopted son of Hara Zaimei (原在明), whom he succeeded as the third head of the Hara School of professional painters. Based in Kyoto, the Hara School served from the late eighteenth through the early twentieth centuries as official artists to the Imperial Court. Hara Zaishō contributed several pieces to the Kyoto Imperial Palace during its reconstruction following a fire in 1854. The most famous of these is a cherry tree motif painted on sliding fusuma doors in the Sakura-no-ma (Cherry Blossom Room).

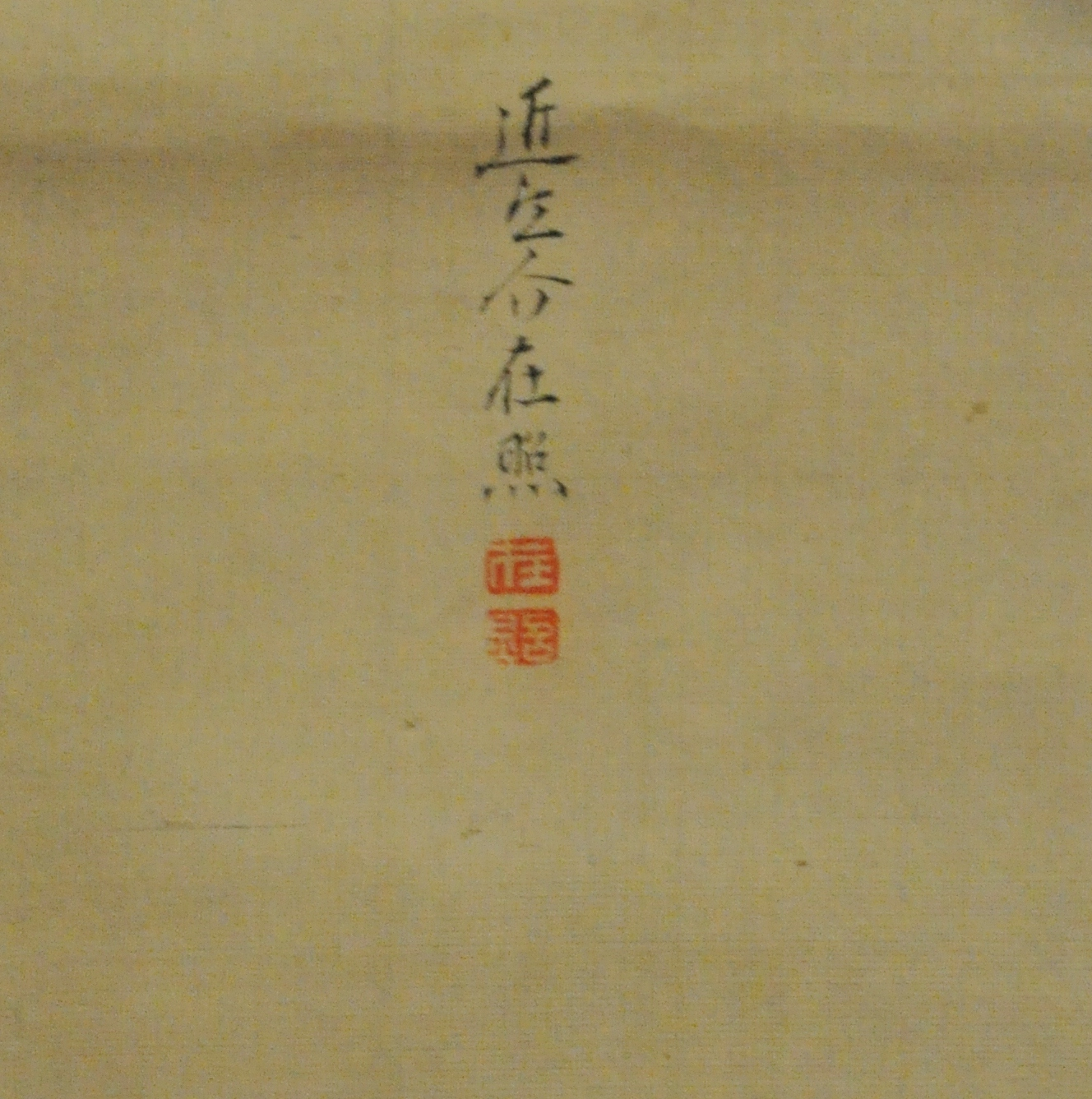
Hara Zaishō's seal and signature

Zaishō’s career spanned the late Edo (1603-1867) and early Meiji (1868-1912) periods, a time of great change within Japan as a result of its 1854 opening to the West. The Hara School was aligned with the Maruyama School of painters, a movement founded in the late 18th century associated with western-influenced tendencies such as objective realism, unified perspective, shading and contouring.

Hara Zaishō is also used the art names Kanran (観瀾) and Yūran (夕鸞).

== Genre ==
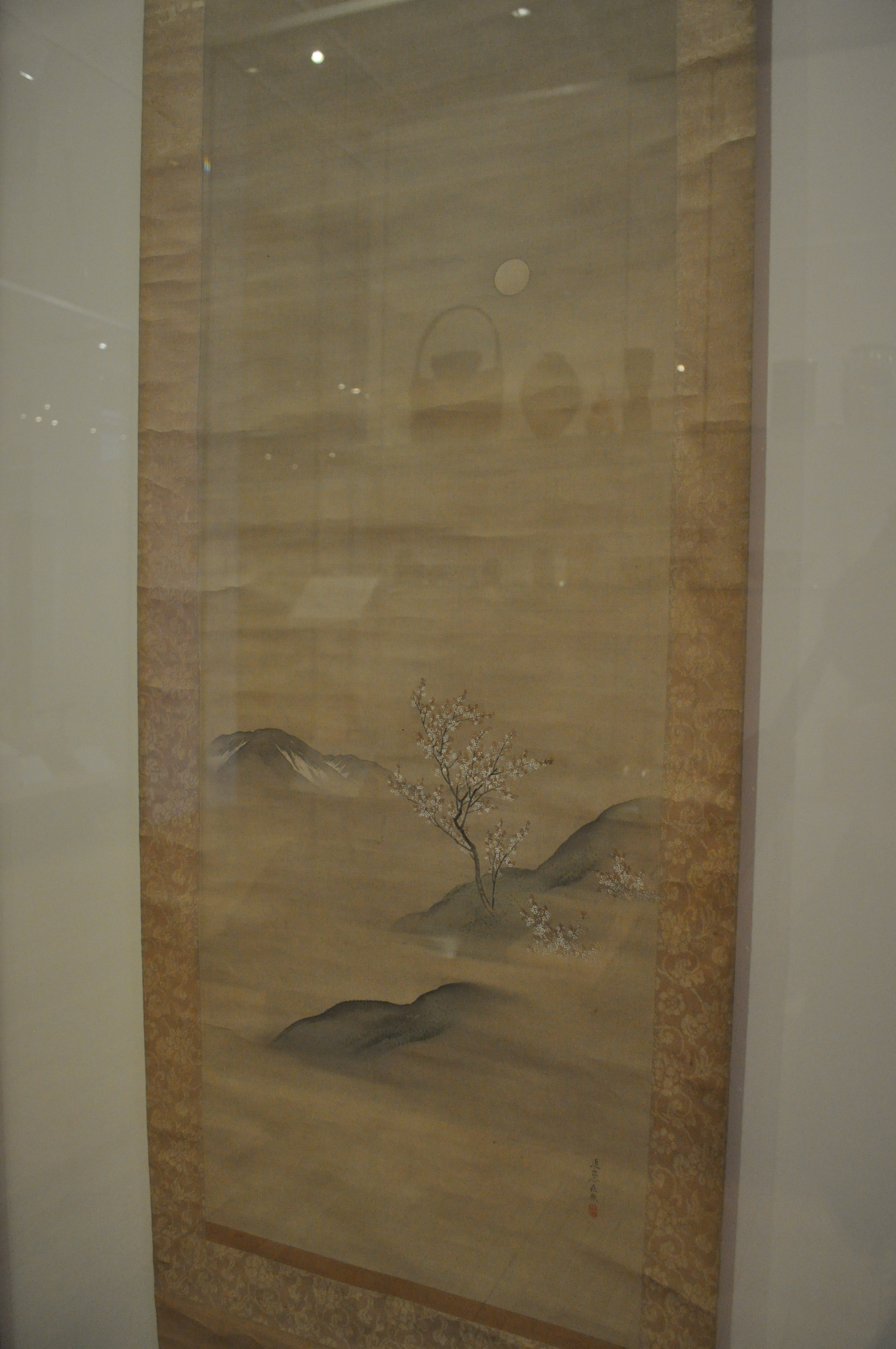
Spring landscape

These two paintings belong to the tsukinami-e genre: images depicting changing landscapes through the seasons. It was not uncommon for tsukinami-e to take the form of diptychs, with the entire year represented by images of spring and autumn. The pair is read from right to left, with spring preceding autumn.

These landscapes are sumi-e—ink paintings—done on silk, a relatively expensive medium reflecting the status of the artist and patron. They are mounted as kakejiku or kakemono, vertical hanging scrolls. This type of painting would typically be hung in a tokonoma alcove, sometimes foregrounded by a seasonal flower arrangement and decorative incense burner. Kakemono were intended to be viewed while frontally seated at the distance of a tatami mat width (approximately 90 cm). Although kakejiku were objects of decoration, their lack of elaboration reflects their secondary purpose as objects to stimulate quiet contemplation.

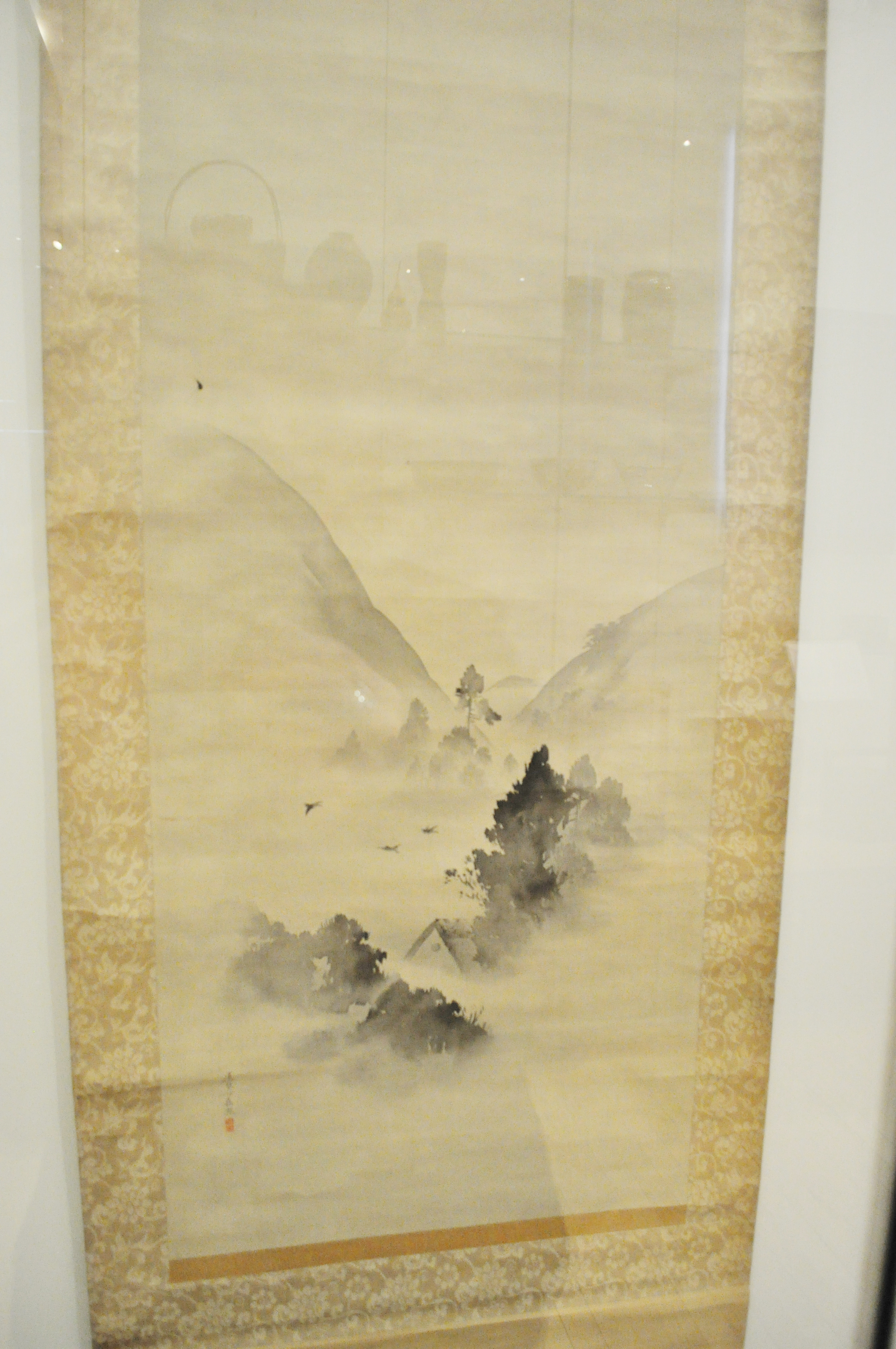
Autumn landscape

This pair of paintings belongs to a period in Japanese art during which depictions of landscape were undergoing reconsideration. Faced with Japan’s emergence as a nation on the world stage, artists were moving away from classical Chinese conventions to develop a more nativized system of symbolic motifs, and treatments of space. The cherry blossoms in the spring image and the thatched roof in the autumn landscape tie Zaishō’s works to contemporary Japan rather than to ancient China.

== Style and content ==
Spring Landscape features a full moon shining above a solitary cherry tree in full bloom planted on the slope of a mountain. It retains the monochrome style with its refined Chinese associations, but adds sparing use of colour in the slight pink of the cherry blossoms, symbolic of spring, of transience and of Japan itself.

In Autumn Landscape, Zaishō again depicts a mountain scene, an environment classically associated with the sacred. Here, the slopes are flanked by pine trees, often invoked as symbols of longevity and steadfastness in counterpoint to the fleetingness of spring’s cherry blossoms.

== Head artists of the Hara School ==
1. Hara Zaichū (原在中) 1750 – 1837
2. Hara Zaimei (原在明) 1778 – 1844
3. Hara Zaishō (原在照) 1813 – 1872
4. Hara Zaisen (原在泉) 1849 – 1916
5. Hara Zaikan (原在寛) 1884 – 1957
6. Hara Arinao (原在修) 1922 – unknown

== See also ==
- Royal Ontario Museum
- Yamato-e
- Hara school of painters
- Female Ghost (Kunisada) - print in same gallery
- Unit 88-9 (Kiyomizu Masahiro) - sculpture in same gallery
- Fan print with two bugaku dancers (Kunisada) - print in same collection
- Ichikawa Omezō as a Pilgrim and Ichikawa Yaozō as a Samurai (Toyokuni I) - print in same gallery
- Eijudō Hibino at Seventy-one (Toyokuni I) - print in same collection
- View of Tempōzan Park in Naniwa (Gochōtei Sadamasu)
