= Glossary of ukiyo-e =

Ukiyo-e printmaking process of "Plum Park in Kameido". Displayed at the Edo-Tokyo Museum.

This is a list of terms frequently encountered in the description of ukiyo-e (浮世絵)-style Japanese woodblock prints and paintings. For a list of print sizes, see below.

- Aizuri-e (藍摺絵); "blue picture"
- Aka-e (赤絵); "red picture"
- Aratame (改); "examined" character found in many censor seals
- Baren (馬連、馬楝); a tool used to rub the back of a sheet of paper to pick up ink from the block
- Beni-e (紅絵); primitive ukiyo-e style prints, usually printed in pink
- Benizuri-e (紅刷絵, "crimson picture"); primitive ukiyo-e style prints, usually printed in pink and green
- Bijin-ga (美(び)人(じん)画(が)); pictures of beautiful women
- Bokashi (ぼかし); technique of applying a gradation of ink to a moistened block to vary lightness and darkness (value) of a single colour
- Censor seal; from 1790 until 1876 all woodblock prints had to be examined by official censors, and marked with their seals
- Chūban (中判); a print size about 7 by 10 inches (18 cm × 25 cm)
- Chūtanzaku (中短冊判); a print size about 14 by 5 inches (36 cm × 13 cm)
- Edo period (江戸時代, Edo jidai); dating from 1603 to 1868, the period when Japanese society was under the rule of the Tokugawa shogunate
- E-hon (絵本); "picture book"
- Egoyomi (盲暦); a picture calendar
- Fudezaishiki (筆彩色); colouring with a paintbrush
- Furikake (振り掛け); powdered minerals or metals sprinkled onto a print during the production process
- Fushiga; satirical ukiyo-e pictures
- Gafu (画譜); album
- Ganso (元祖); "founder" prefix, used on a print to indicate the publisher
- Geisha (芸者); a common subject in ukiyo-e
- Hanga (版画); a print
- Hanmoto (版元); a publisher
- Hashira-e (柱絵, "pillar print"); a print size about 28 by 4.5 inches (71 cm × 11 cm)
- Horishi (彫師); a carver of woodblocks
- Hosoban (細判); a print size about 13 by 5 inches (33 cm × 13 cm)
- Iro-ban (色板); a colour block
- Jōge-e (上下絵); prints that can be viewed from either top or bottom
- The Tales of Ise (伊勢物語, Ise monogatari); an uta monogatari, or collection of waka poems and associated narratives, dating from the Heian period
- Ishizuri-e (石摺絵); a print that mimics a stone rubbing, with uninked images or text on a dark, usually black, background
- Ita-bokashi (板ぼかし, "block shading"); a technique for producing gradation achieved by sanding or abrading the edges of the carving
- Kaika-e (開化絵); ukiyo-e genre of the Meiji period that celebrated the Westernization of Tokyo and its people
- Kakemono-e (掛物絵); an ōban diptych arranged one above the other (also a hanging scroll painting)
- Kachō-ga (花鳥画); paintings of flowers and birds
- Kakihan (書き判); the artist's tag, used on prints with (or instead of) a signature
- Kamigata (上方); region of Japan referring to the cities of Kyoto and Osaka
- Kappazuri (合羽摺); prints of a single colour (usually black) coloured by stenciling. Prints produced entirely by stenciling, without woodblocks, are also called kappazuri.
- Karazuri (空摺); dry printing, embossing
- Kasure-bori (掠れ彫り, "scratch carving"); style of woodblock carving imitating dry brushstrokes
- Kisokaidō (中山道); one of the Five Routes of the Edo period
- Kirazuri (雲母摺り); a method used in woodblock printmaking using mica powder to add sparkle
- Kiwame (極); "approved" character found in many censor seals
- Kojita-e (小下絵); a rough sketch
- Komochi-e (子持絵); prints with moveable parts
- Kuchi-e (口絵); frontispieces of books, especially woodblock printed frontispieces for Japanese romance novels and literary magazines published from the 1890s to the 1910s
- Mameban (豆判); a print size about 4.75 by 3.2 inches (12.1 cm × 8.1 cm), sometimes called a "toy print"
- Megane-e (眼鏡絵); a print designed using graphical perspective techniques and viewed through a convex lens to produce a three-dimensional effect
- Meisho (名所); famous sites often depicted in ukiyo-e
- Mitate-e (見立絵); a subgenre of ukiyo-e that employs allusions, puns, and incongruities, often to parody classical art or events
- Mount Fuji (富士山, Fujisan); the highest mountain in Japan, a common subject
- Musha-e (武者絵); warrior print
- Muzan-e (無残絵); woodcut prints of violent nature published in the late Edo and Meiji periods
- Nagasaki-e (長崎絵); prints, produced in Nagasaki during the Edo period, that depict the port city of Nagasaki, the Dutch and Chinese who frequented it, and foreign curiosities such as exotic fauna and Dutch and Chinese ships
- Namazu-e (鯰絵); prints depicting the Japanese mythological giant catfish, the Namazu (鯰)
- Nikuhitsu-ga (肉筆画); a painting in the ukiyo-e style
- Nishiki-e (錦絵); multi-coloured woodblock printing
- Ōban (大判); a print size about 15.5 by 10.5 inches (39 cm × 27 cm)
- Ōkubi-e (大首絵); portrait prints, busts
- Omocha-e (玩具絵); ukiyo-e created as picture books and toys for children
- Schools (流派): Schools of ukiyo-e artists
- Senso-e (戰爭絵); prints depicting the Sino-Japanese and Russo-Japanese Wars
- Shin-hanga (新版画, "New prints"); 20th century ukiyo-e revival prints
- Shini-e (死絵); "death pictures" or "death portraits"
- Shita-e (下絵); final preparatory drawing pasted onto the block for printing
- Shikishiban (色紙判); a print size about 8 by 7 inches (20 cm × 18 cm), often used for surimono
- Shomen-zuri (正面摺, "front-printing"); a polishing technique sometimes used to create a shiny surface on black areas in prints
- Shunga (春画, "spring image"); erotically themed art
- Sōsaku-hanga (創作版画); an early 20th-century art movement of woodblock printing
- Sumizuri-e; a type of monochromatic woodblock printing that uses only black ink
- Surimono (摺物); privately commissioned prints for special occasions such as the New Year
- Surishi (摺師); a printer
- Tan-e (丹絵); primitive ukiyo-e style prints, usually printed in red
- Tate-e (縦絵); a print in vertical or "portrait" format
- Tenpō Reforms (天保の改革, Tenpō no kaikaku); an array of economic policies introduced in 1842 by the Tokugawa Shogunate, precursor to Meiji Restoration
- Tōkaidō (東海道); the most important of the Five Routes of the Edo period
- Uchiwa-e (団扇絵); prints on paddle-shaped hand fans (uchiwa)
- Uki-e (浮絵, "floating picture"); a picture using linear perspective
- Ukiyo (浮世, "the floating world"); the culture of Edo-period Japan (1600–1867)
- Urushi-e (漆絵); paintings painted with lacquer, and a printing style using ink that resembles the darkness and thickness of black lacquer
- Waka (和歌); Japanese poetry
- Washi (和紙); traditional Japanese paper
- Yakusha-e (役者絵); prints of kabuki actors
- Yoko-e (横絵); a print in horizontal or "landscape" format
- Yokohama-e (横浜絵); prints depicting non-East Asian foreigners and scenes of Yokohama.
- Yūrei-zu (幽霊図); prints depicting ghosts, demons and other supernatural beings

== Print sizes ==
The Japanese terms for vertical (portrait) and horizontal (landscape) formats for images are tate-e (縦絵) and yoko-e (横絵), respectively.

Below is a table of common Tokugawa-period print sizes. Sizes varied depending on the period, and those given are approximate they are based on the pre-printing paper sizes, and paper was often trimmed after printing.

name	translation	cm (in)
aiban (合判)	intermediate	34 × 22.5 (13.4 × 8.9)
bai-ōban (倍大判)	intermediate	45.7 × 34.5 (18.0 × 13.6)
chūban (中判)	medium	26 × 19 (10.2 × 7.5)
hashira-e (柱絵)	pillar print	73 × 12 (28.7 × 4.7)
hosoban (細判) or hoso-e (細絵)	narrow	33 × 14.5 (13.0 × 5.7)
hosoban (細判) or hoso-e (細絵)	narrow	39 × 17 (15.4 × 6.7)
kakemono-e (掛物絵)	hanging scroll	76.5 × 23 (30.1 × 9.1)
nagaban (長判)	long	50 × 20 (19.7 × 7.9)
ōban (大判)	large	38 × 25.5 (15.0 × 10.0)
ōban (大判)	large	58 × 32 (23 × 13)
ō-tanzaku (大短冊判)	large poem card	38 × 17 (15.0 × 6.7)
chū-tanzaku (中短冊判)	medium poem card	38 × 13 (15.0 × 5.1)
surimono (摺物)	a genre of woodblock print	35 × 20 (13.8 × 7.9)
surimono (摺物)	a genre of woodblock print	12 × 9 (4.7 × 3.5) – 21 × 18 (8.3 × 7.1)

== See also ==
- Schools of ukiyo-e artists
- Ukiyo-e
- Woodblock printing in Japan
