= Iwai (surname) =

Iwai (written: 岩井 lit. "rock well" or 岩居) is a Japanese surname. Notable people with the surname include:

- Akira Iwai (岩井 章; 1922–1997), Japanese trade union leader
- Atsuhiro Iwai (岩井 厚裕; born 1967), Japanese footballer
- Fumio Iwai (岩井 文男; born 1960), Japanese politician
- Fumito Iwai (岩井 郁人; born 1990), Japanese musician
- Iwai Hanshirō I (1652–1699), Japanese kabuki artist
- Iwai Hanshirō V (1776–1847), Japanese kabuki artist
- Iwai Hanshirō VIII (1829–1882), Japanese kabuki artist
- Katsuhito Iwai (岩井 克人; born 1947), Japanese economist
- Masaki Iwai (岩井 真幸; born 1985), Japanese curler
- Shigeki Iwai (岩井 茂樹; born 1968), Japanese politician
- Shunji Iwai (岩井 俊二; born 1963), Japanese film director
- Shuya Iwai (岩井 柊弥; born 2000), Japanese footballer
- Toshio Iwai (岩井 俊雄; born 1962), Japanese artist
- Yukiko Iwai (voice actress) (岩居 由希子; born 1972), Japanese voice actress
- Yukiko Iwai (Onyanko Club) (岩井 由紀子; born 1968), Japanese pop singer

== Fictional characters ==
- Munehisa Iwai (岩井 宗久), a Confidant and supporting character in Persona 5 and Persona 5: The Phantom X
