= Chuban =

Chuban may refer to:

- Chuban people, a Chinese tribe which was a successor to the Yueban
- Chūban, a size of Japanese wood block print
