= List of works by Toyohara Chikanobu =

List of works by Toyohara Chikanobu includes artwork created over many decades and in a range of formats.

Details about the woodblock prints of Toyohara Chikanobu are provided below in a specific format:

- (1) the transliterated title employing Wiki-romanization criteria;
- (2) the title (enclosed in parentheses) of the work reproduced using the kanji and hiragana found in the title cartouche;
- (3) the number {enclosed in curly brackets} of prints in the series (where known), excluding the covers, the moku roku, and any introductory or complementary pages;
- (4) the Gregorian calendar date(s) «enclosed in doubled angle brackets» calculated from the date found in the otodoke or in the vertical margins of the print, which showed the Meiji calendar year, month, and day that authorities accepted a notification of intent to publish;
- (5) a referral [enclosed in square brackets] to the section containing the publisher's name and address;
- (6) an English translation of the title.

== Yotsugiri-e ==
A partial list of single-panel series in yotsugiri format includes:

- Chūshingura (忠臣蔵) {12} «1884» Chūshingura
- Honchō kōtō ki (本朝皇統記) «1878» [25] The History of the Imperial Line of Our Country
- Tōkyō hana kurabe (東京花竸) «1879» [29] Comparing the Flowers of Tokyo.

== Ōban yoko-e ==
A partial list of single-panel series in ōban yoko-e format includes:

- Kanke jūni kagetsu no uchi (冠化十二ヶ月の内) {12} «1880» ~~[24]~~ Twelve Months at Home with the Royal Ladies (Note: 24. Matsui Eikichi (松井栄吉) was located at 弓町二番地)
- Kyōiku azuma bijin jūni kagetsu zen (教育東美人會十二ヶ月全) {12} The Education of Beautiful Women in Edo throughout the Whole Year (Note: 19. Hasegawa Sumi (長谷川壽美) was located at 東京市京橋区南傳馬町二丁目十七番地) (Note: 4. Narasawa Kenjirō (奈良澤健次郎) was located at 東京神田區錦町二丁目三番地)
- Heike monogatari (平家物語) «1898» ~~[3]~~ The Tale of the Heike (Note: 3. Fukuda Hatsujirō (福田初次郎) was located at 日本橋区艮谷川町十九番地)
- Azuma fūzoku mokuroku (東風俗目録) {12} «1901» ~~[15]~~ An Annal of Eastern Pastimes (Note: 15. Matsuki Heikichi (松木平吉) was located at 東京市日本橋區吉川町二番地)
- Edo nishiki (江戸錦) {at least 47} «1903-5» ~~[15]~~ Edo Brocade (Note: 15. Matsuki Heikichi (松木平吉) was located at 東京市日本橋區吉川町二番地)
- Yōchi hana (幼稚花) «1905» [] Flowers of Childhood
- Kyōiku rekishi gafu (教育歴史画布) {24} «1906» ~~[4]~~ Educational Pictorial Album of History (Note: 4. Narasawa Kenjirō (奈良澤健次郎) was located at 東京神田區錦町二丁目三番地)

== Chūban yoko-e ==
Prints in chūban yoko-e format include:

- Zen'aku ryōtō kyōkun kagami (善悪両頭教訓鑑) «1882» [ ] Examples of Moral Precepts Employing the Two Heads of Good and Evil
- Honcho buyū kagami (本朝武勇鑑) {20} «1882» [10] Models of Our Country's Valor
- Chiyoda no fūzoku (千代田乃風俗) {12} «1883» [] Customs at Chiyoda

=== Chūban tate-e ===
Prints in chūban tate-e format include:

- Miyako no hana iro (都の花色) «unk» probably a hikifuda (advertising circular) for cloth/clothing, published by Tōkyō hatsubaimoto (Tokyo sales agency)

== Ōban tate-e ==
A partial list of single-panel series in ōban tate-e format includes:

- Imayō bijin kurabe (今様美人竸) «1877» [27] Comparing Modern Women
- Senchi hakkei (戰地八景) «1877» [] Eight Scenes at the Battle Front
- Kagoshima eimei den (鹿児島英名傳) «1877» [21] Reports of the Heroes of Kagoshima
- Kagoshima yūfu den (鹿児島勇婦傳) «1877» [13] Reports of the Heroines of Kagoshima
- Kagoshima chinbun (鹿児嶋珍聞) «1877» [25] Extraordinary News from Kagoshima
- Azuma sugata shiki no uta (東姿四季の詠) «1879–1881» [20] Compositions in the Eastern Style for the Four Seasons
- Eimei bushō no men (英銘武将之面) «1880» [12] Faces of Famous Military Commanders
- Hana sugata bijin sama (花姿美人樣) «~1880» [8] Alluring Flowers as Beautiful Women
- Honchō musha kagami (本朝武者鏡) «1881» [] A Mirror of Our Country's Warriors
- Imayō bijin kagami (今様美人鏡) «1881» [22] Reflections of the Modern Woman
- Tō kyōgen homare no wazogi (當狂言名譽俳優) «1882» [28] Hit Plays with Famous Actors
- Tōkyō meisho kurabe (東京名所竸) «1882» [12] Comparing the Famous Places of Tokyo
- Kaika kyōiku mari uta (開化教育鞠唄) «1883» [18] Songs of Enlightenment and Education
- Eiyū musha kagami (英雄 武者 鏡) «1883» [] Mirror of Heroic Warriors
- Meiyo iro no sakiwake (名譽色咲分) «1883-4» [1] Honorable Flowers Blooming in Different Colors
- Tōkyō meisho (東京名所) «1884», [31] Famous Places in Tokyo
- Setsugekka (雪月花) Snow, Moon, Flower
- Gempei seisuiki (源平盛衰記) «1885» [10] A Chronicle of the Rise and Fall of the Minamoto and the Taira
- Azuma nishiki chūya kurabe (東錦晝夜竸) «1886» [1, 10] {50} Brocade of the East, A Contrast of Day and Night
- Atari jutsu no kyōgen zukushi (當戌の狂言つくし) «1886» [ ] A Collection of This Season's Kyōgen
- Tokugawa kakei ryakki (徳川家系略記) «1886-7» [8] A Brief Account of the Tokugawa Lineage
- Tōshun sugatami kyō (當春姿見竸) «1887» [30] A full-length mirror comparison this spring
- Imayō tōkyō hakkei (今様東京八景) {8} «1888» [11] Eight Views of Tokyo Today
- Kaika bijin kurabe (開花美人競) «1889» [6] A Contest between Blossoms and Beautiful Women
- Azuma fūzoku fuku zukushi (東風俗福つくし) {30} «1889–1890» [9] Customs of the Capital displayed by Homonyms of the word fuku
- Azuma fūzoku nenjū gyōji (東風俗年中行事) {12} «1890» [11] Annual Events and Customs in the Capital
- Nijūshi kō mitate e awase (二十四孝見立画合) {24} «1890-1» [2] A Contrasting Parody of The Twenty-four Filial Exemplars
- Bakin chojutsu (馬琴著述) {?} «1890-1» [6] Stories by Bakin
- Gentō shashin kurabe (幻燈寫心竸) {20} «1890-2» [7] Daydreams by Magic Lantern
- Fugaku shū (富嶽集) «1891» [1] A Collection of Scenes of Mt. Fuji
- Azuma kagami (東鑑) «1892» [26] Mirror of the East
- Mitate jūnishi (見立十二支) {12} «1893-4» [6] A Contrasting Parody of the Zodiac
- Nishin sensō zue (日 清戰爭圖繪) «1894» [] Pictures of the Sino-Japanese War
- Fujin sokuhatsu shukuzu (婦人束髪縮圖) «1895» [17] Reduced Drawings of Western-style Hairdos for Women
- Shiki no hana kyōgen mitate (四季の花狂言見立) «1895» [16] Comparison of Kyōgen to Seasonal Flowers
- Azuma (あづま) {24} «1896,1904» [3,15] The East
- Jidai kagami (時代鑑) {50} «1896-8» [15] A Mirror of the Ages
- Shin bijin (真美人) {36} «1897-8» [14] Truly Beautiful Women
- Tōkyō meisho (東京名所) «1897–1902» [23] Famous Places of Tokyo
- Kagoshima eimenden (鹿兒島英名傅) [21] Chronicles of the Glories of the Satsuma Revolt

Two of his well-known ōban tate-e diptych series include:

- Meisho bijin kai (名所美人合) «1897-8» [15] An Exposition of Beautiful Women in Scenic Places
- Nihon meijo totsu (日本名女咄) «1893» [5] Very Tall Stories about Famous Women of Japan

Examples of unmounted, signed kabuki uchiwa-e are uncommon:

A kakemono series exists:

- Fusei fūzoku (浮世風俗) «1905» [] Everyday Customs

A partial list of triptych series includes:

- Hana no Gyosho (花之御所) «1878» [] Flowers of the Imperial Palace
- Zensei kuruwa no nigiwai (全盛廓の賑ひ) «1879» [5] Popular and Prosperous Pleasure Quarters
- Honchō musha kagami (本朝武者鏡) «1881» [] A Mirror of Our Country's Warriors
- Nansō Satomi Hakkenden (八犬伝) «1883» [] Biographies of Eight Dogs
- Bunraku-za Shin Kyōgen (文楽座新狂言) «1885» [ ] New Kyōgen in the Bunraku style
- Edo sunago nenjū gyōji (江戸砂子年中行事) «1885» [ ] Sands of Edo - Annual Events
- Chōyō no zu (重陽之圗) «1885» [6] Scenes from a Chrysanthemum Festival
- Tosei furi (渡世振) «1887» [] Modern Life
- Kiken no reijō (貴顕之令嬢) «1887» [] Distinguished Young Ladies
- Chōsen hen hō roku (朝鮮變報録) «1888» [] Record and Transcript of the Korea Incident
- Nikkō meisho (日光名所) «1888» [6] Famous Places of Nikkō
- Matzu no Sakae (松の栄) «1889» [ ] The Splendor of the Pines
- Mite Soga (見立曽我) «1887-9» [7] Parody of the Soga brothers
- Edo fūzoku jūni kagetsu no uchi (江戸風俗十二ヶ月の内) «1889» [7] Daily Life in Edo Twelve Months a Year
- Onko azuma no hana (温故東の花) «1889-9» [ ] Looking into the Past: The Pride of the East
- Setsugekka no uchi (雪月花の内) «1891» [32] Within Serene Beauty
- Saigoku ga shū (西国雅集) «1892» [ ] A Collection of West Country Elegance
- Nihon sankei no zu (日本三景の内) «1892» [ ] Three Famous views of Japan
- Zenkoku shōkei no uchi (全国勝景之内) «1892» [11] Scenic views from around the country
- Kokon yamato fūzoku no uchi (古今倭風俗之内) «1892-3» [6] Customs of Old and Modern Japan
- Yamato fūzoku (倭風俗) «1892-3» [11] Customs and Manners of Yamato
- Shiki no nagame (四季の詠) «1893-4» [] Chants for the Four Seasons
- Azuma no fūzoku (あづま風俗) «1894» [] Daily Life of the East
- Chiyoda no o-oku (千代田の大奥) {42}«1894-6» [3] The Ladies' Chambers of Chiyoda Palace
- Imayo no bijin (今様の美人) «1895» [] Contemporary Women
- Jūni kagetsu no uchi (十二ヶ月の内) «1895-8» [] Twelve Months
- Kachō fūgetsu (花鳥風月) «1895» [7] Beauties of Nature
- Fujin shoreshiki no zu (婦人諸禮式の図) «1895-6» [23] Scenes of Various Women's Ceremonies
- Tokugawa jidai kifujin (徳川時代貴婦人) «1896» [2] Ladies of the Tokugawa period
- Shichiyō no uchi (七曜之内) «1896» [11] The Seven Days of the Week
- Meiji fūzoku (明治風俗) «1896» [] Meiji Customs
- Shōchikubai (松竹梅) «1896» [] Pine, Bamboo, and Plum (Three Friends of Winter)
- Nihon Rekishi Kyōkun Gaku (日本歴史教訓画) «1897» [] Pictoral Lessons of Japanese History
- Chiyoda no on-omote (千代田の御表) {33} «1898» [3] Chiyoda Palace: Outside the Walls
- Joreishiki ryaku zu (女禮式略の図) «1898» [9] Handbook of Ladies' Etiquette
- Fujin moro reishiki no zu (婦人諸礼式の図) «1899» [] Illustrations of Ceremonies when Ladies gather
- Ima to mukashi (今とむかし) «1898» [2] Then and Now
- Take no hitofushi (竹乃一節) «1898-1904» [15] Verses of the Middle Rank
- Azuma bijin (あずま美人) «1897-1903» [] Beautiful Women of the East
- Chōsenhen hō (朝鮮變報) - A Report of the Korean Disturbance
- Ryūkō bijin (流行美人) «~1895-99» [] Fashionable Beauties
- Ueno kōen (上野公園) «1899» [2] Ueno Park
- Kyōiku yōchien no zu (教育幼稚園之図) «1899» [] Scene of Kindergarten Education
- Yamato fūzoku (倭風俗) «1898» [6] Customs and Manners of Yamato
- Ōisotōri no zu (大磯通之圖) - Scenes of Oisotōri
- Hana no gosho (花之御所) - The Flower Palace
- Fusei fūzoku (浮世風俗) «1905» [] Everyday Customs

In addition, his œuvre contains a very large number of three panel scenes with individual titles, not collated into series. One group of these could be assembled under the heading, "The Royal Household at Play", another could be grouped under "Scenes from the Kabuki", and a third under two sub-titles, "The Satsuma War" and "The Sino-Japanese War.'

An album of twenty-five triptychs was published in 1877 by several artists, including Chikanobu, which brought to light the events of an important domestic insurrection (the Satsuma Rebellion).

A bound album in ōban tate-e format was conceived and assembled by the publisher, Matsuki Heikichi, under the title of "Kyōdō risshiki" [Self-made Men Worthy of Emulation/Exemplars of Learning and Achievement] containing 50 prints (though 53 are known) by various artists including Chikanobu who produced two of the images: #16 Hagaku and # 43 Chikako. Although the publication dates of the prints in this series ranged from 1885 to 1890, Chikanobu's two contributions to this effort are dated the fourth and fifth months of 1886.

=== Publishers ===
Chikanobu's work was printed and disseminated by a variety of publishers.

- [1] Kobayashi Tetsujirō (Note: 1. Kōbayashi Tetsujirō (小林鉄次郎) was located at 日本橋区通三丁目十三番地)
- [2] Hasegawa Tsunejirō (Note: 2. Hasegawa Tsunejirō (長谷川常冶郎) was located at 神田区鍛治丁五バンチ)
- [3] Fukuda Hatsujirō (Note: 3. Fukuda Hatsujirō (福田初次郎) was located at 日本橋区艮谷川町十九番地)
- [4] Narasawa Kenjirō (Note: 4. Narasawa Kenjirō (奈良澤健次郎) was located at 東京神田區錦町二丁目三番地)
- [5] Takegawa Seikichi (Note: 5. Takegawa Seikichi (武川清吉) was located at 日本バン区本銀丁二丁目十二バンチ)
- [6] Morimoto Junzaburō (Note: 6. Morimoto Junzaburō (森本順三郎) was located at 浅草區瓦丁二バンチ)
- [7] Yokoyama Ryōhachi (Note: 7. Yokoyama Ryōhachi (横山良八) was located at下谷区スキヤ町十二バンチ)
- [8] Komiyama Shōhei (Note: 8. Komiyama Shōhei (小宮山昇平) was located at 日本バン区本右町二丁目九バンチ)
- [9] Takegawa Unokichi (Note: 9. Takegawa Unokichi (武川卯之吉) was located at 日本バン区本銀丁二丁目十二バンチ)
- [10] Tsunashima Kamekichi (Note: 10. Tsunashima Kamekichi (綱島亀吉) was located at 日本橋区馬喰町二丁目十四番地)
- [11] Hasegawa Sonokichi (Note: 11. Hasegawa Sonokichi (長谷川園吉) was located at 日本橋区小傳馬町三丁目十七番地)
- [12] Miura Bumei (Note: 12. Miura Bumei (三浦武明) was located at 浅草並木町一番地)
- [13] Yamamura Kinzaburō (Note: 13. Yamamura Kinzaburō (山村金三郎) was located at 浅草吉野町五十六番地)
- [14] Akiyama Buemon (Note: 14. Akiyama Buemon (秋山武右衞門) was located at 日本橋區室町三丁目九番地)
- [15] Matsuki Heikichi (Note: 15. Matsuki Heikichi (松木平吉) was located at 東京市日本橋區吉川町二番地)
- [16] Tsujioka Bunsuke (Note: 16. Tsujioka Bunsuke (辻岡文助) was located at 日本椅区横山町三丁目二番地)
- [17] Yamaguchi Yoshi (Note: 17. Yamaguchi Yoshi (山口芳)was located at 神田松冨丁四番チ)
- [18] Arita-ya (Note: 18. Arita-ya (有田冶) was located at 駒込東庁町百四十七番地)
- [19] Hasegawa Sumi (Note: 19. Hasegawa Sumi (長谷川壽美) was located at 東京市京橋区南傳馬町二丁目十七番地)
- [20] Toshimo Toshin (Note: 20. Toshimo Toshin (眞下常信) was located at 森川丁一番地)
- [21] Ookura Sonbei (Note: 21. Ookura Sonbei (大倉孫兵工) was located at 日本橋道一丁目十九番地)
- [22] Hatano Tsunesada (Note: 22. Hatano Tsunesada (定多野常定) was located at 馮島六丁目廿五番チ)
- [23] Katsuki Yoshikatsu (Note: 23. Katsuki Yoshikatsu (勝木吉勝) was located at 東京市下谷区スキヤ町十五番地)
- [24] Matsui Eikichi (Note: 24. Matsui Eikichi (松井栄吉) was located at 弓町二番地)
- [25] Kimura Fukujirō (Note: 25. Kimura Fukujirō (木村福次郎) was located at 浅草十九町二番地)
- [26] Murakami Takashi (Note: 26. Murakami Takashi (村上剛) was located at 芝区高輪車丁八十三番地)
- [27] 亘市兵工 (Note: 27. (亘市兵工) was located at 堀江丁二丁目十バンチ)
- [28] Asano Eizō (Note: 28. Asano Eizō (浅野栄造) was located at 上く東黒門丁十四号地)
- [29] Hayashi Kichi (Note: 29. Hayashi Kichi- (林吉- ) was located at 南傳馬町一丁目二番地)
- [30] Inoue Shigeru (heikō) (Note: 28. Inoue Shigeru (heikō) was located at 日本椅區馬喰町三丁目十九バンチ)

- [31] Furuchi Korekatsu (Note: 31. Furuchi Korekatsu (古市之親) was located at 下谷上車坆廾五バンチ)
- [32] Kashiwagi Nobeichirō (Note: 32. Kashiwagi Nobeichirō (柏木延一郎) was located at 京橋区銀座四丁目四バンチ)
