= Akae =

Akae may refer to:

- Akae Baku (赤江 瀑) (born 1933), Japanese novelist
- Tamao Akae (赤江 珠緒) (born 1975), Japanese freelance announcer
- Akae Beka is a roots reggae band
- Aka-e, type of woodblock print
- The oath that revealed the secrets of the cycles of the earth to Kasbeel
