= Shini-e =

Japanese woodblock prints

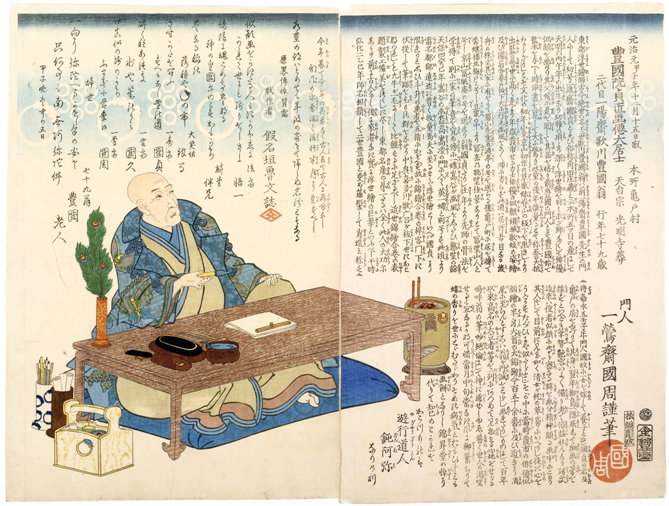
Shini-e of Kunisada by Kunichika, 1864

Shini-e (死絵, "Memorial prints"), also called "death pictures" or "death portraits", are Japanese woodblock prints, particularly those done in the ukiyo-e style popular through the Edo period (1603–1867) and into the beginnings of the 20th century.

When a kabuki actor died, memorial portraits shini-e were conventionally published with his farewell poem and posthumous name.

Memorial portraits were created by ukiyo-e artists to honor a colleague or former teacher who had died.

In Osaka, the death of a prominent kabuki actor could prompt several artists to issue commemorative shini-e or tsuizen-e prints simultaneously. Following the death of Arashi Kitsusaburō I in September 1821, for example, several of Osaka's leading print designers issued such prints to mark his career and death.

== Gallery ==
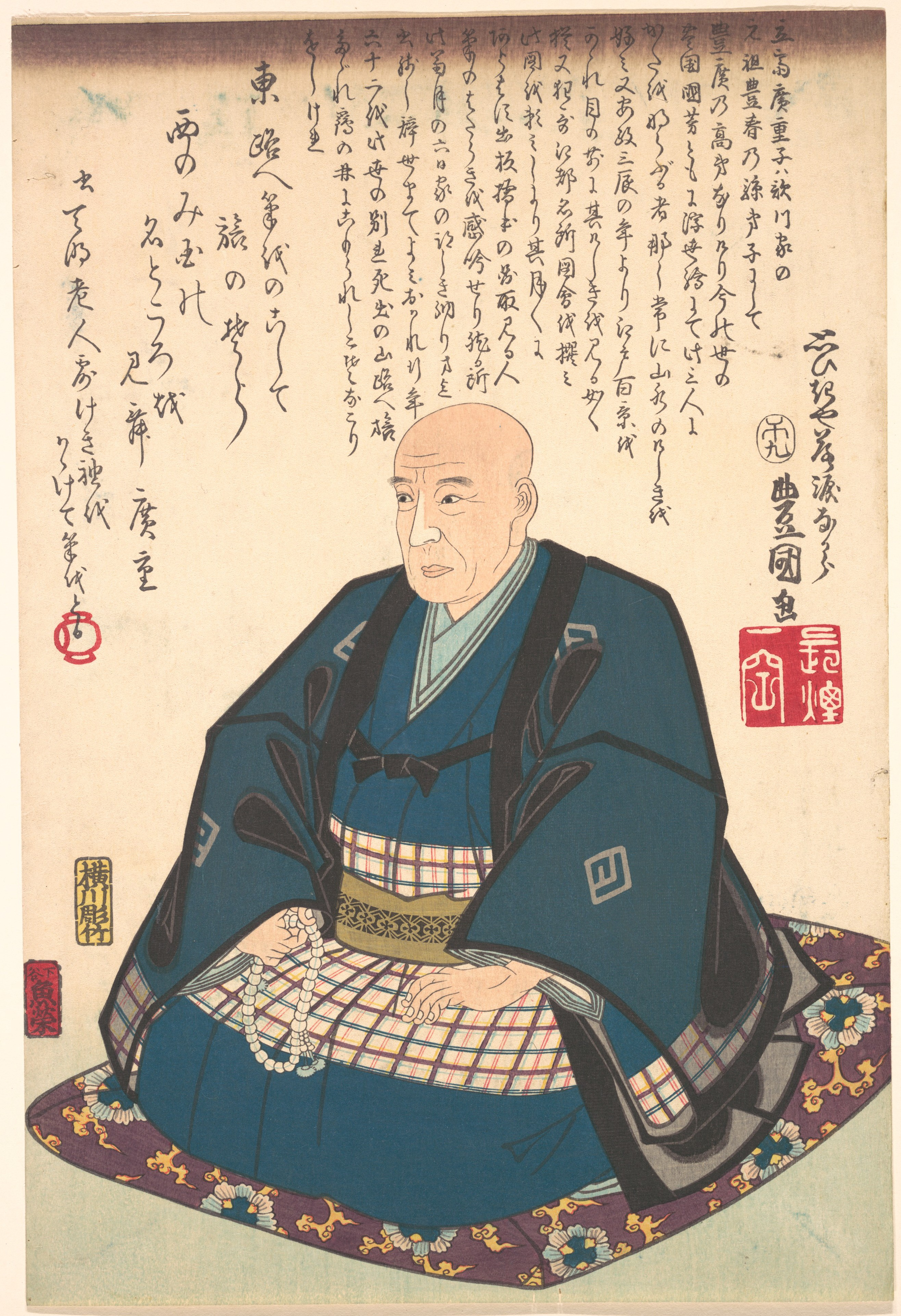
Hiroshige by Kunisada, 1858

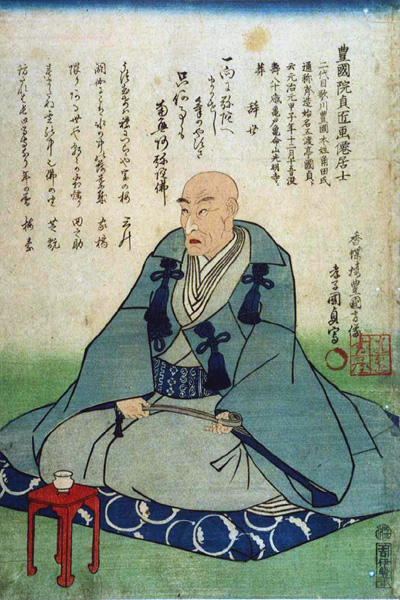
Kunisada by Toyohara Kunichika, 1864

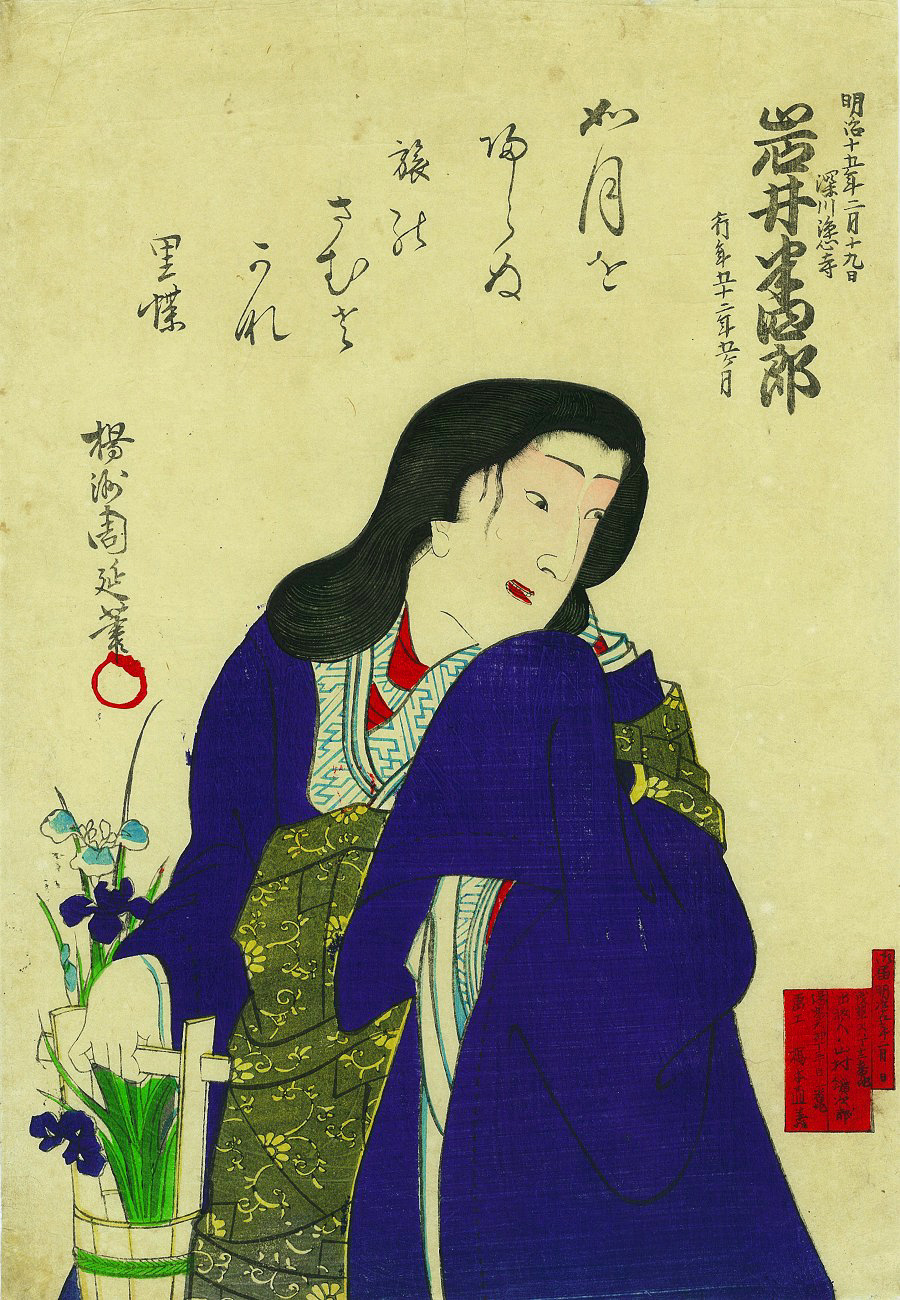
Iwai Hanshirō VIII, by Toyohara Chikanobu 1882

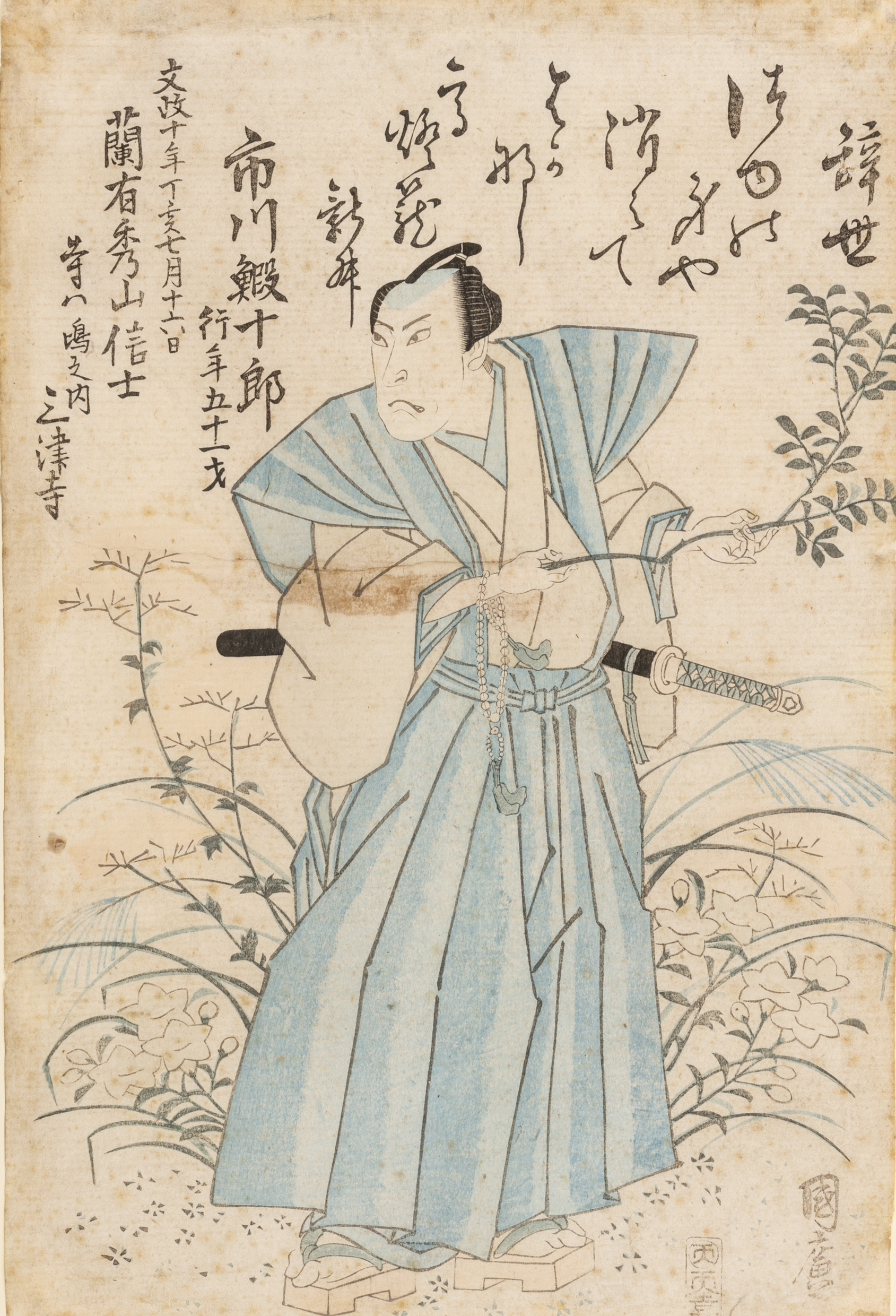
Ichikawa Ebijuro I by Utagawa Kunihiro, 1827.

== See also ==
- List of ukiyo-e terms

== Bibliography ==
- Keyes, Roger S. and Keiko Mizushima. (1973). The Theatrical World of Osaka Prints: a Collection of Eighteenth and Nineteenth Century Japanese woodblock Prints in the Philadelphia Museum of Art.Philadelphia: Philadelphia Museum of Art. OCLC 186356770
- Newland, Amy Reigle. (2005). The Hotei Encyclopedia of Japanese Woodblock Prints. Amsterdam : Hotei. ISBN 9789074822657; OCLC 61666175
