= Iwai =

Iwai or IWAI may refer to:

- Iwai (surname)
- Iwai, Ibaraki, a city in Japan
- Iwai Station, a railway station in Minamibōsō, Chiba Prefecture, Japan
- Iwai Rebellion, a rebellion against the Yamato court that took place in Tsukushi Province, Japan
- I'wai, the culture hero of the Koko Y'ao in Australian Aboriginal mythology
- Inland Waterways Authority of India
- Inland Waterways Association of Ireland
