= Utagawa Hirokage =

19th-century Japanese painter

Signature of Utagawa Hirokage reading Hirokage ga (広景画)

Utagawa Hirokage (歌川 広景), also known as Ichiyūsai Hirokage, was a Japanese designer of ukiyo-e woodblock prints, who was active from about 1855 to 1865. He was a pupil of Utagawa Hiroshige I. From 1860 to 1861, Hirokage designed the series of ōban size prints titled Edo meisho dōke zukushi (Joyful Events in Famous Places in Edo). His reputation is based primarily upon this series and his 1859 triptych Aomono sakana gunzei daikassen no zu (The Great Battle between the Fruits and Vegetables and the Fish).

== Gallery ==
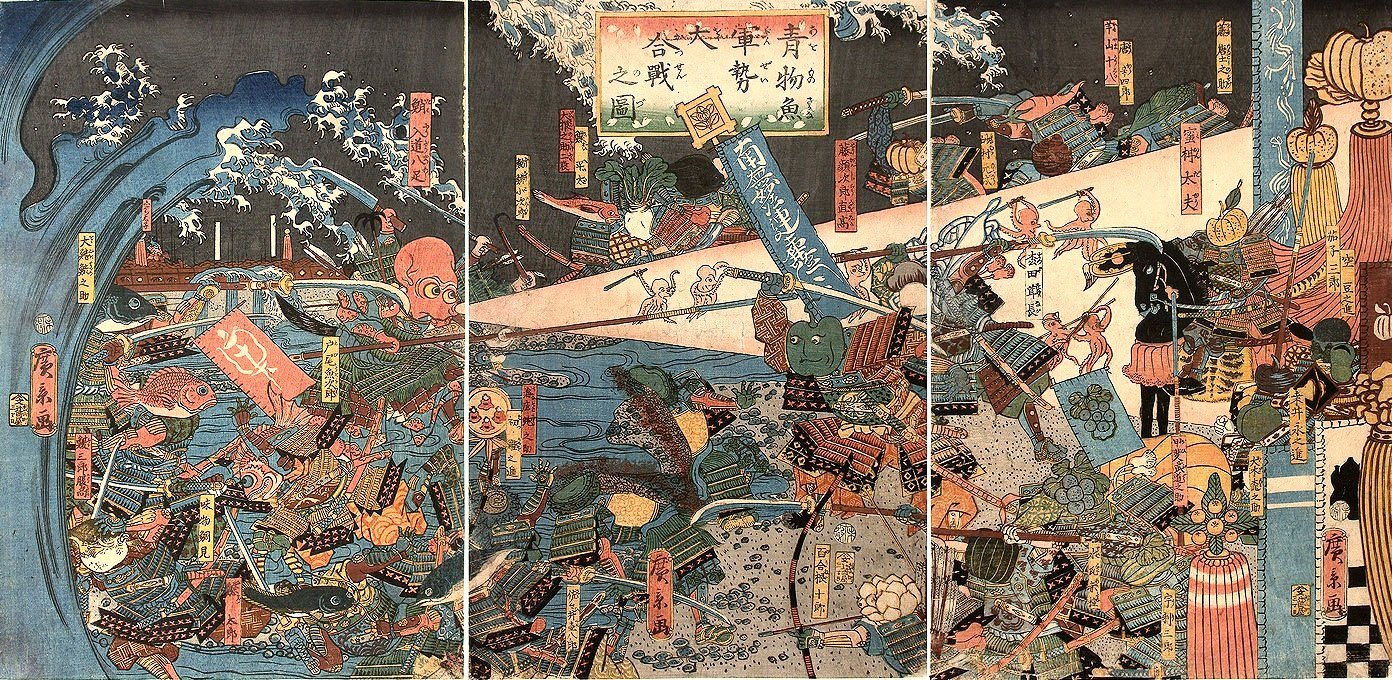
Aomono sakana gunzei daikassen no zu (The Great Battle between the Fruits and Vegetables and the Fish), woodblock triptych by Hirokage, 1859

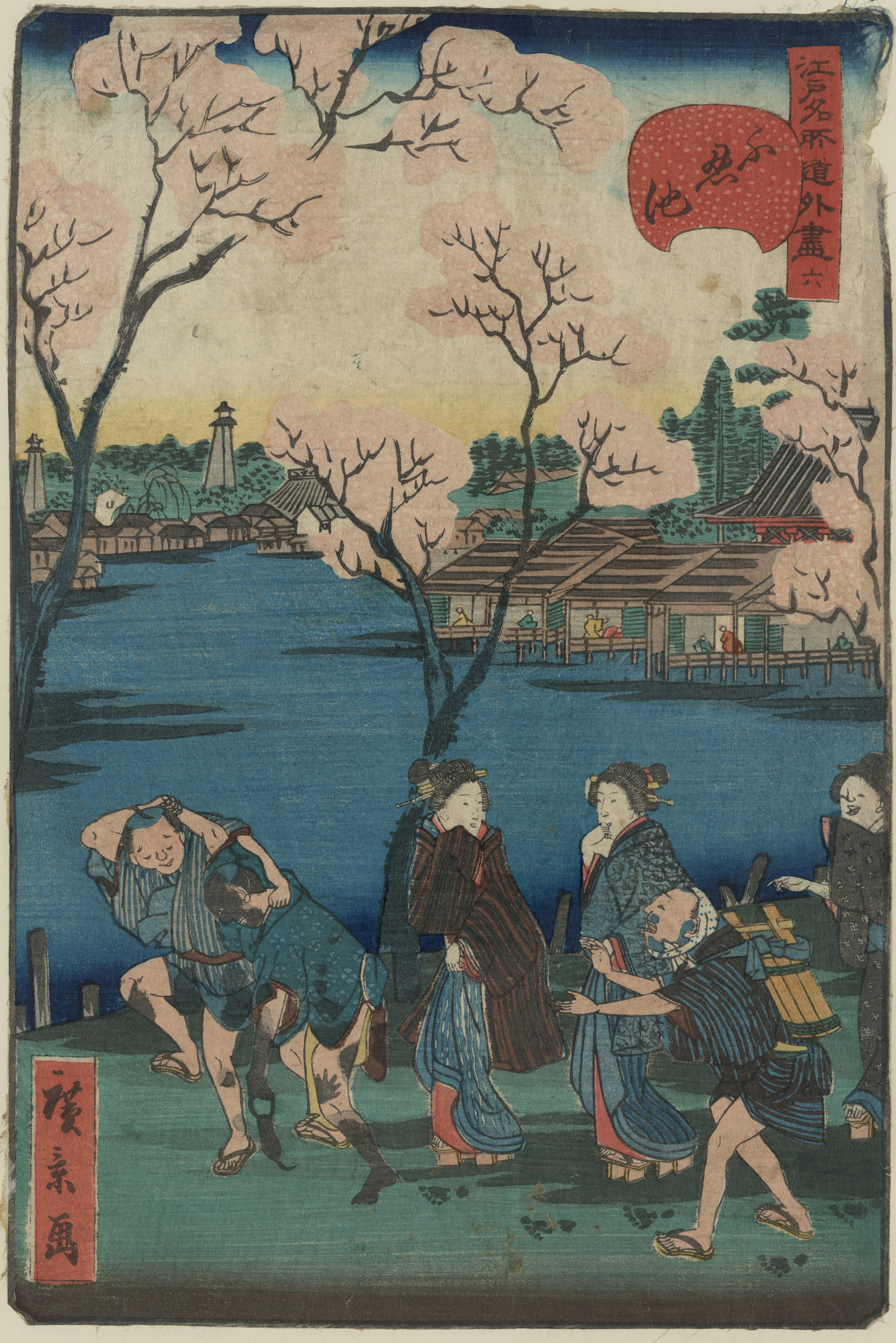
Woodcut print shows a comical scene with a group of people walking along the bank of the Shinobazu Pond, with cherry blossoms and dwellings in the background. 1859

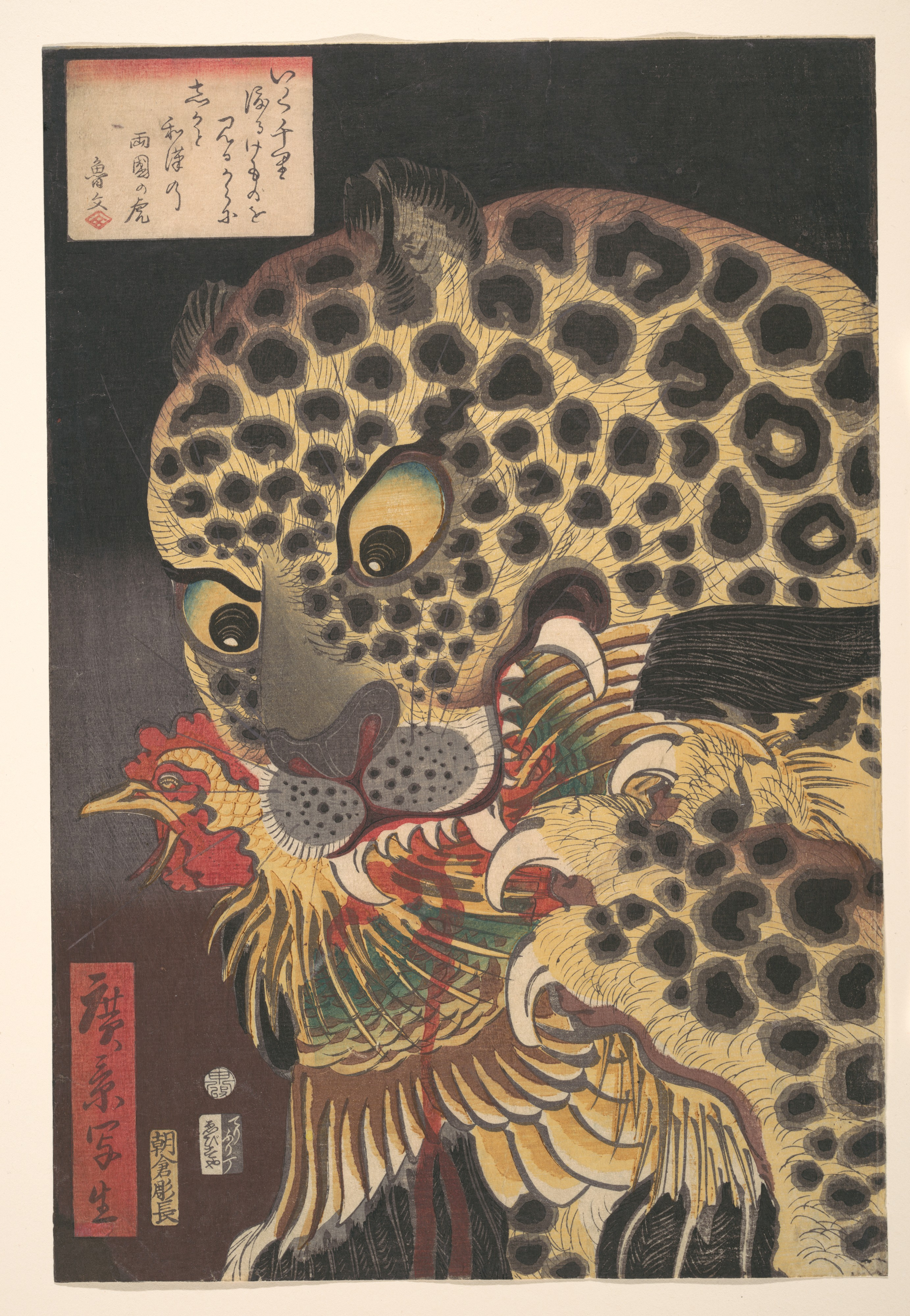
The Tiger of Ryōgoku from the series True Scenes, 1860
