= Toyohara Chikanobu =

Japanese samurai and artist (1838–1912)

- Born: 1838; Jōetsu, Niigata, Japan
- Died: 1912 (aged 73–74)
- Known for: Painting; Printmaking

Toyohara Chikanobu (豊原周延; 1838–1912), better known to his contemporaries as Yōshū Chikanobu (楊洲周延), was a Japanese painter and printmaker who was widely regarded as a prolific woodblock artist during the Meiji era.

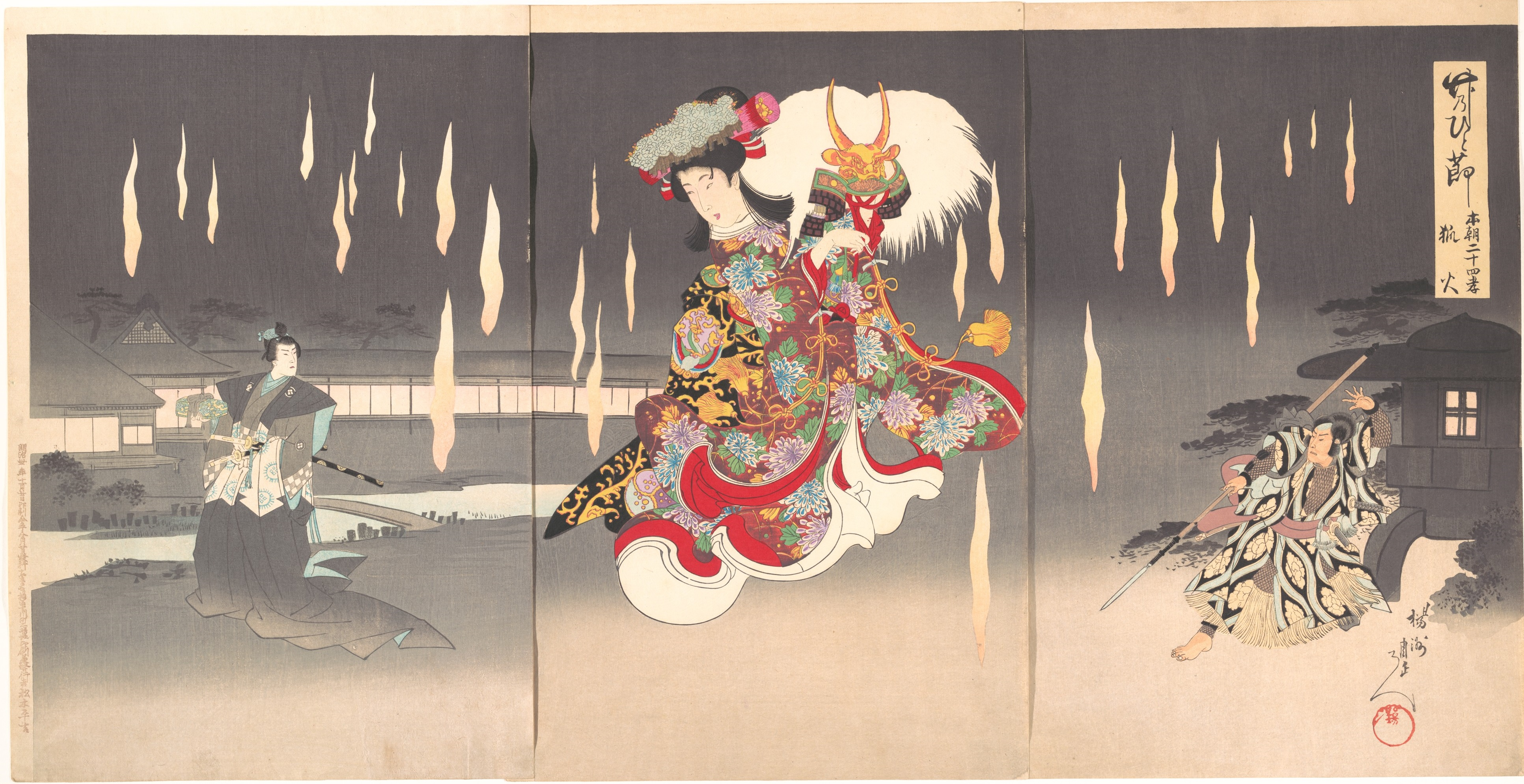
Print depicting Yaegaki-hime carrying the helmet of the warrior Takeda Shingen as she dances amid magical foxfires in Honcho Nijushiko. Triptych by Chikanobu.

== Names ==
Chikanobu signed his artwork "Yōshū Chikanobu" (楊洲周延). This was his "art name" (作品名, sakuhinmei). The artist's "real name" (本名, honmyō) was Hashimoto Naoyoshi (橋本直義); and it was published in his obituary.

Many of his earliest works were signed "studio of Yōshū Chikanobu" (楊洲齋周延, Yōshū-sai Chikanobu); a small number of his early creations were simply signed "Yōshū" (楊洲). At least one triptych from 12 Meiji (1879) exists signed "Yōshū Naoyoshi" (楊洲直義).

The portrait of the Emperor Meiji held by the British Museum is inscribed "drawn by Yōshū Chikanobu by special request" (應需楊洲周延筆, motome ni ōjite Yōshū Chikanobu hitsu).

No works have surfaced that are signed either "Toyohara Chikanobu" or "Hashimoto Chikanobu".

== Military career ==
Chikanobu was a retainer of the Sakakibara clan of Takada Domain in Echigo Province. After the collapse of the Tokugawa Shogunate, he joined the Shōgitai and fought in the Battle of Ueno.

He joined Tokugawa loyalists in Hakodate, Hokkaidō, where he fought in the Battle of Hakodate at the Goryōkaku star fort. He served under the leadership of Enomoto Takeaki and Ōtori Keisuke; and he achieved fame for his bravery.

Following the Shōgitai's surrender, he was remanded along with others to the authorities in the Takada domain.

== Artistic career ==
In 1875 (Meiji 8), he decided to try to make a living as an artist. He travelled to Tokyo. He found work as an artist for the Kaishin Shimbun. In addition, he produced nishiki-e artworks. In his younger days, he had studied the Kanō school of painting; but his interest was drawn to ukiyo-e. He studied with a disciple of Keisai Eisen and then he joined the school of Ichiyūsai Kuniyoshi; during this period, he called himself Yoshitsuru. After Kuniyoshi's death, he studied with Kunisada. He then became the principal pupil of Toyohara Kunichika, from whom he took both the "chika" element of his art name and the Toyohara school name. He also referred to himself as Yōshū.

Chikanobu worked for at least seven publishers between the late 1870s and the mid-1880s. His output increased steadily during this period, and while his elegant figures were at times interchangeable from one print to another, he produced some of the era's most memorable triptychs.

Like many ukiyo-e artists, Chikanobu turned his attention towards a great variety of subjects. His work ranged from Japanese mythology to depictions of the battlefields of his lifetime to women's fashions. As well as a number of the other artists of this period, he too portrayed kabuki actors in character, and is well known for his impressions of the mie (mise en scène) of kabuki productions. Chikanobu was known as a master of bijinga (images of beautiful women), and for illustrating changes in women's fashion, including both traditional and Western clothing. His work illustrated the changes in coiffures and make-up across time. For example, in Chikanobu's images in Mirror of Ages (1897), the hair styles of the Tenmei era, 1781-1789 are distinguished from those of the Keiō era, 1865–1867. His works capture the transition from the age of the samurai to Meiji modernity, the artistic chaos of the Meiji period exemplifying the concept of "furumekashii/imamekashii".

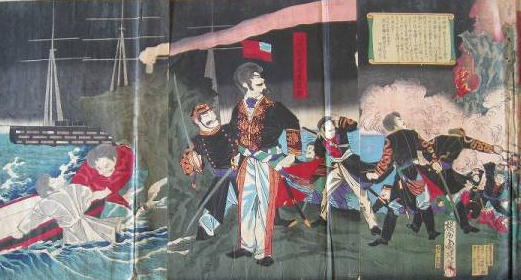
"The Korean Uprising of 1882" — woodblock print by Chikanobu

Chikanobu is a recognizable Meiji period artist, but his subjects were sometimes drawn from earlier historical eras. For example, one print illustrates an incident during the 1855 Ansei Edo earthquake. The early Meiji period was marked by clashes between disputing samurai forces with differing views about ending Japan's self-imposed isolation and about the changing relationship between the Imperial court and the Tokugawa shogunate. He created a range of impressions and scenes of the Satsuma Rebellion and Saigō Takamori. Some of these prints illustrated the period of domestic unrest and other subjects of topical interest, including prints like the 1882 image of the Imo Incident, also known as the Jingo Incident (壬午事変, jingo jihen) at right.

The greatest number of Chikanobu's war prints (戦争絵, sensō-e) appeared in triptych format. These works documented the First Sino-Japanese War of 1894–1895. For example, the "Victory at Asan" was published with a contemporaneous account of the July 29, 1894 battle.

His series Chiyoda no Ōoku (1895), together with its companion Chiyoda no Omote (1897), documents court life and annual ceremonies within the women's quarters of Edo Castle before the Meiji Restoration. The women are depicted as elegant, dignified ideal figures showing little emotion, suggesting an atmosphere of quiet, harmonious order.

Among those influenced by Chikanobu were Nobukazu (楊斎延一, Yōsai Nobukazu) and Gyokuei (楊堂玉英, Yōdō Gyokuei).

== Formats ==
Like the majority of his contemporaries, he worked mostly in the ōban tate-e format. There are quite a number of single panel series, as well as many other prints in this format which are not a part of any series.

He produced several series in the ōban yoko-e format, which were usually then folded cross-wise to produce an album.

Although he is, perhaps, best known for his triptychs, single topics and series, two diptych series are known as well. There are, at least, three polyptych prints known.

His signature may also be found in the line drawings and illustrations in a number of ehon (絵本), which were mostly of a historical nature. In addition, there are fan prints uchiwa-e (団扇絵), as well as number of sheets of sugoroku (すごろく) with his signature that still exist and at least three prints in the kakemono-e format were produced in his latter years.

== Selected works ==
In a statistical overview derived from writings by and about Hashimoto Toyohara, OCLC/WorldCat encompasses roughly 300+ works in 300+ publications in 2 languages and 700+ library holdings

- 鳥追阿松海上新話. 初編 (1878)
- 鳥追阿松海上新話. 2編 (1878)
- 五人殲苦魔物語. 初編 (1879)
- 艷娘毒蛇淵. 2編上の卷 (1880)
- 白菖阿繁顛末. 3編 (1880)
- 沢村田之助曙草紙. 初編 (1880)
- 浪枕江の島新語. 3編下之卷 (1880)
- 浪枕江の島新語. 3編中之卷 (1880)
- 浪枕江の島新語. 3編上之卷 (1880)
- 浪枕江の島新語. 初編上之卷 (1880)
- 浪枕江の島新語. 2編下之卷 (1880)
- 坂東彥三倭一流. 初編 (1880)
- 川上行義復讐新話. 2編下の卷 (1881)
- 川上行義復讐新話. 初編上之卷 (1881)
- 真田三代記 : 絵本. 初編 (1882)
- 明良双葉艸. 8編上 (1888)
- 明良双葉艸. 5編上 (1888)
- 千代田之大奥 by 楊洲周延 (1895)

== See also ==
- List of works by Toyohara Chikanobu
- List of ukiyo-e terms
- War artist

== Notes ==
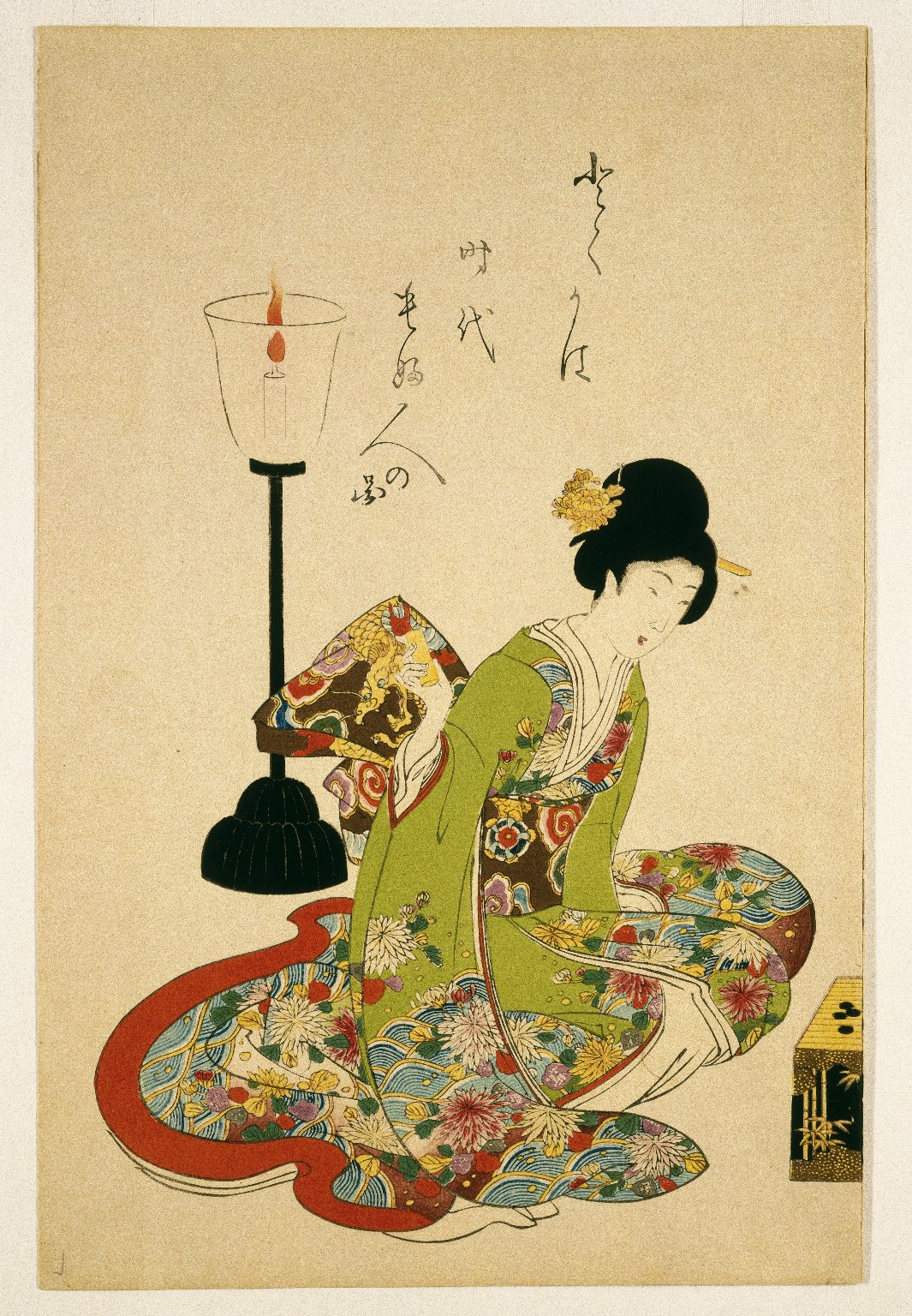
A Seated Woman with a Lacquer Candle Stand (c. 1875) by Chikanobu. Wood-block print, 36.2 × 23.8 cm (14.25 × 9.37 in). Collection of Brooklyn Museum.
