= Iwai Hanshirō VIII =

Kubuki actor (1829–1882)

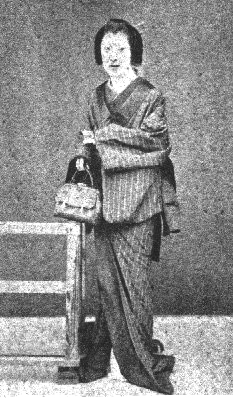
Iwai Hanshirō VIII in costume for an onnagata role. Unknown date, c. early Meiji period.

Iwai Hanshirō VIII (岩井半四郎 (8代目), October 2, 1829 – February 19, 1882) was a Japanese kabuki performer, known both for his own work and for his place in the lineage of a family of kabuki actors. He was the son of Iwai Hanshirō VII.

Iwai Hanshirō was a stage name with significant cultural and historical connotations.

In the conservative Kabuki world, stage names are passed from father to son in formal system which converts the kabuki stage name into a mark of accomplishment. This actor assumed the mantle of his father's stage name in 1872.

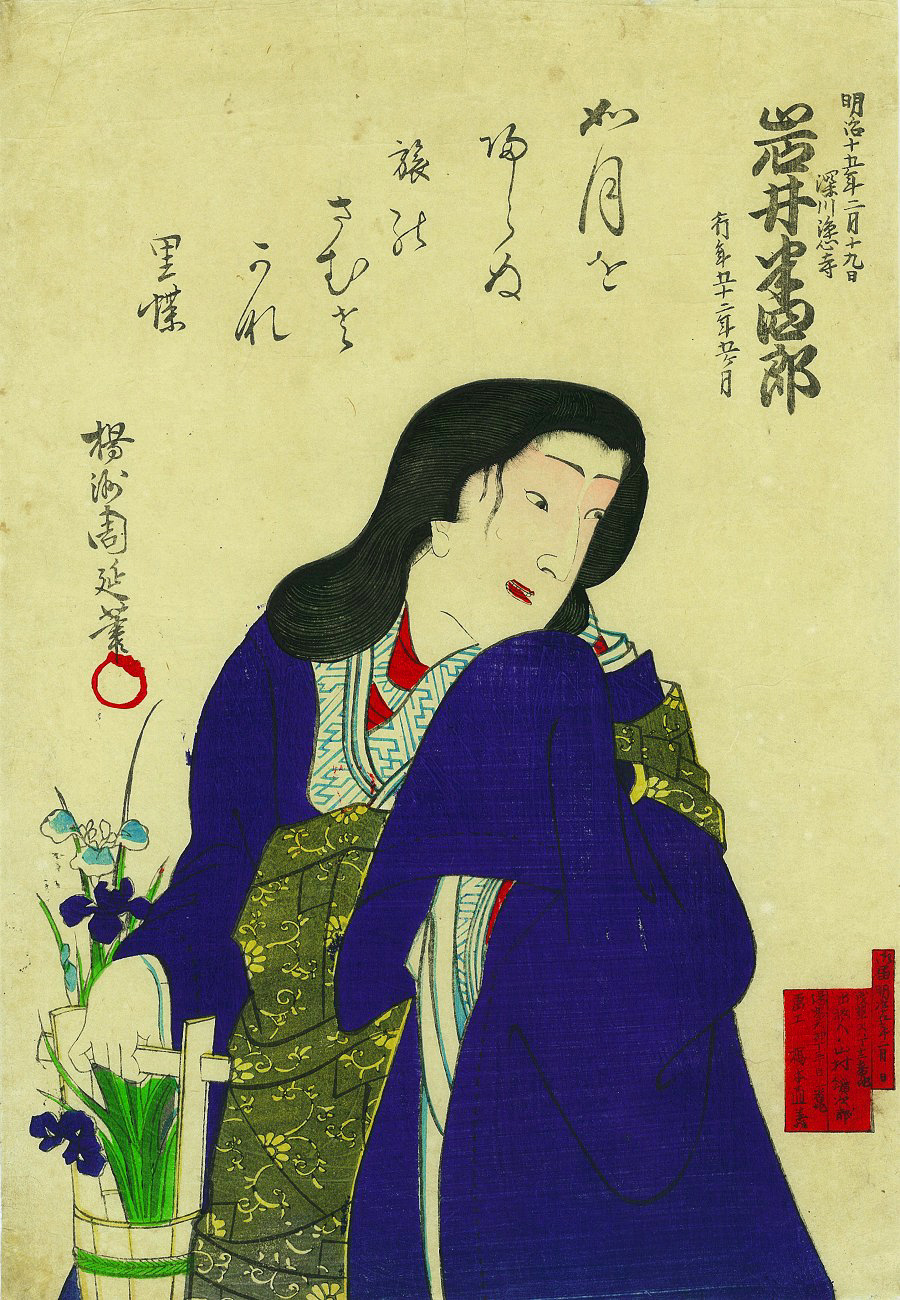
Posthumous memorial print (shini-e) of Iwai Hanshirō VIII. Ukiyo-e woodblock print by Yōshū Chikanobu 1882

Lineage of Iwai stage names

- Iwai Hanshirō I (1652–1699)
- Iwai Hanshirō II (d. 1710)
- Iwai Hanshirō III (1698–1760)
- Iwai Hanshirō IV (1747–1800)
- Iwai Hanshirō V (1776–1847)
- Iwai Hanshirō VI (1799–1836)
- Iwai Hanshirō VII (1804–1845)
- Iwai Hanshirō VIII (1829–1882)
- Iwai Hanshirō IX (1882–1945)
- Iwai Hanshirō X (1927-2011)

== Family ==
Born into a prominent Kabuki acting family, he was the great-great-grandson of Sawamura Sōjūrō II (二代目 澤村宗十郎), a popular Kabuki actor from the Kamigata region (present-day Kansai region) who specialized in Tachiyaku roles (i.e., male roles).

His first great-grandfather, Iwai Hanshirō IV (四代目 岩井半四郎) was one of the most popular onnagata actors (i.e. Kabuki actors who exclusively played female roles) of the second half of the 17th century and was considered one of the two leading Edo onnagata (the other being his archrival Segawa Kikunojō III).

His second great-grandfather, Sawamura Sōjūrō III (三代目 澤村宗十郎) was a renowned and outstanding tachiyaku actor who was active from the 1760s to the 1800s and who was one of the best actors of the role of Ōboshi Yuranosuke (the protagonist of Kanadehon Chūshingura) of his time.

His two grandfathers, Iwai Hanshirō V (五代目 岩井半四郎) and Segawa Rokō IV (四代目 瀬川路考) were two of the greatest onnagata actors of their period and rivaled each other for the title of best onnagata in Edo.

His father Iwai Hanshirō VII (七代目 岩井半四郎) and his uncle Iwai Hanshirō VI (六代目 岩井半四郎) were known to be talented onnagata actors, but unfortunately both of their careers were cut short by illness while they were in their prime.

His father-in-law, Nakamura Kanzaburō XII (十二代目 中村勘三郎) was the last great zamoto of the Nakamura-za (one of the major Kabuki theaters in Edo).

== See also ==
- Shūmei
