= Komochi-e =

Japanese woodblock prints

Komochi-e (子持絵) or trick pictures are Japanese prints with movable printed paper flaps or other moveable parts. Multicolor komochi-e may be called komochi nishiki-e (子持錦絵).

This komochi-e shows a single print with the flaps in different positions. It is a scene from the kabuki play Manete Mimasu yotsuya no kikigaki (当三升四谷聞書). The artist is Utagawa Kuniyoshi, the date is 1848, and it shows actor Ichikawa Danjūrō VIII in the role of the murderer Tamiya Iemon:

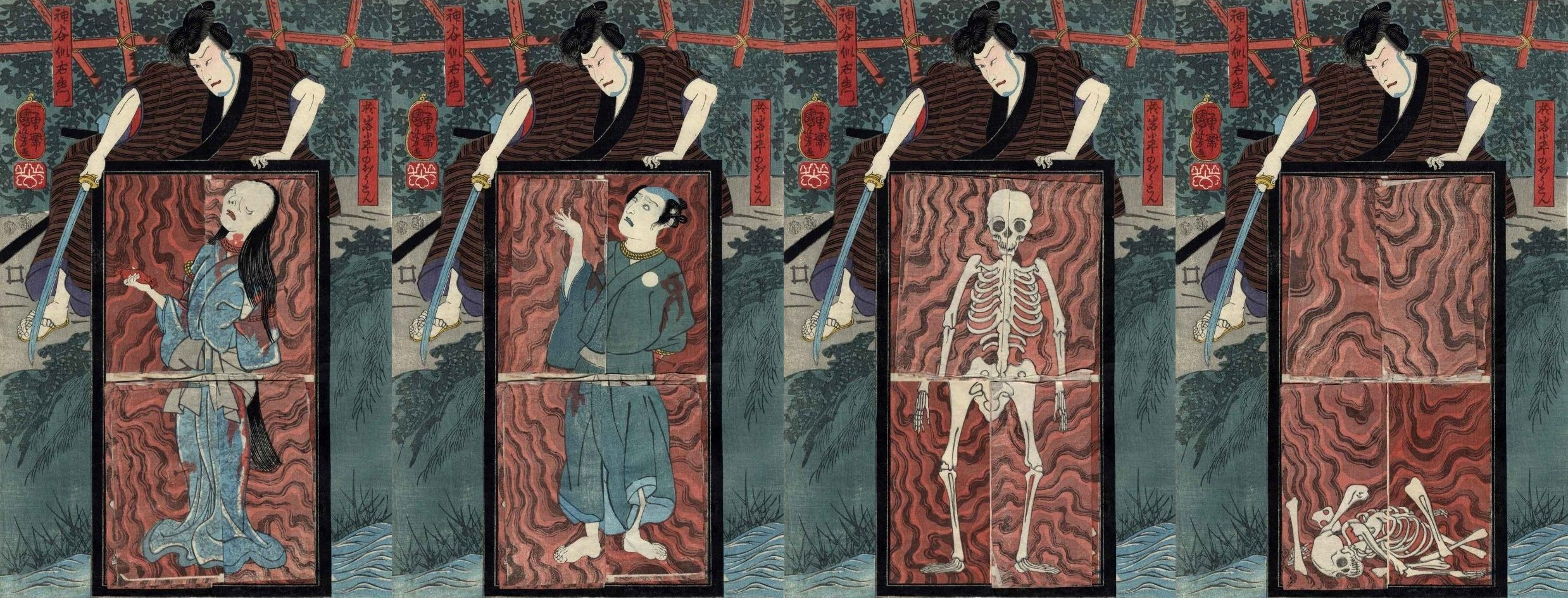
Komochi-e of Ichikawa Danjūrō VIII as Tamiya Iemon by Utagawa Kuniyoshi, 1848
