= Fan print with two bugaku dancers =

Ukiyo-e woodblock print by Utagawa Kunisada

Fan Print with two Bugaku Dancers
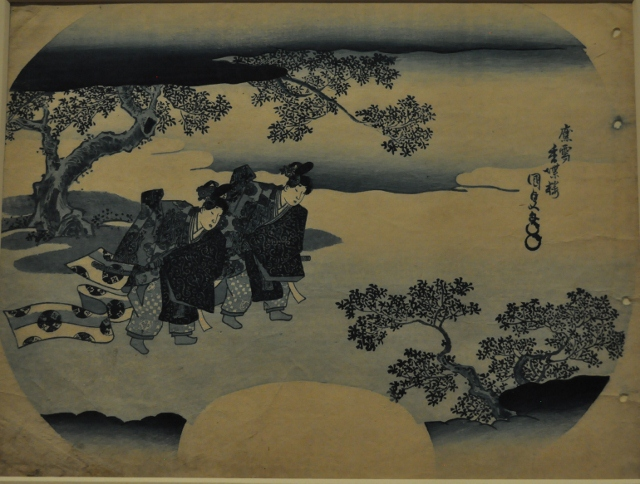
- Fan Print with two Bugaku Dancers, Utagawa Kunisada (Toyokuni III)
- Artist: Utagawa Kunisada (Toyokuni III)
- Year: mid-1820s – 1844
- Type: ukiyo-e woodblock print
- Condition: not on display
- Location: Royal Ontario Museum, Toronto
- Owner: Royal Ontario Museum
- Accession: 926.18.1015

Fan print with two bugaku dancers is an ukiyo-e woodblock print dating to sometime between the mid-1820s and 1844 by celebrated Edo period artist Utagawa Kunisada, also known as Toyokuni III. This print is simultaneously an example of the uchiwa-e (fan print) and aizuri-e (monochromatic blue print) genres. It is part of the permanent collection of the Royal Ontario Museum, Toronto, Canada.

== Uchiwa-e ==
Uchiwa (団扇) are non-folding, flat, oval fans. They are still used today for cooling rice in the preparation of sushi, in dance performances, and as a cooling tool. Historically, uchiwa were a predominantly female accessory, men typically carrying folding fans known as ōgi (扇), suehiro (末広) or sensu (扇子). They are associated with summer, traditionally having been sold only during the summer months, and decorated with summer imagery. At least one modern critic argues that, due to their use by women during periods of heat, uchiwa "can have suggestive connotations."

Like ōgi-e (扇絵) folding fan prints, uchiwa-e were traditionally made from washi rice paper mounted on a wooden frame. Images were printed on paper, then cut along the margins and pasted onto a skeletal bamboo frame. As a result of their frequent handling, few pristine mounted examples remain.

== Aizuri-e ==
Also known as aizome-e (藍染絵) and ai-e (藍絵), aizuri-e (藍摺絵) translates literally as "blue printed picture," and describes prints that are produced entirely or predominantly in shades of blue. A counterpart to ostensibly red and pink benizuri-e (紅摺絵), aizuri-e were a late Edo period development. Perhaps due to the fact that single colour prints were cheaper to produce, the aizuri technique was particularly popular for uchiwa-e.

In the past, some art historians theorized that aizuri-e arose as a result of an 1841 government ban on the use of lavish colour in the then-dominant nishiki-e (錦絵), multi-coloured woodblock prints. The existence of a number of prominent examples predating the ban, however, suggests that aizuri-e did not simply come about as an alternative to poly-chromatic images. While the earliest recorded use is in an 1829 print by Eisen, Utagawa Sadahide, Hokusai, Hiroshige, Toyokuni II and Kunisada all produced notable examples.

The increased popularity of aizuri-e is directly linked to the 1829 importation of the first synthetic colouring agent to Japan. Known in the west as Prussian blue, Berlin blue, or bero (ベロ) as it came to be known, effectively challenged natural indigo as an ukiyo-e mainstay due to its lower price and decreased susceptibility to fading from light exposure. Aizuri has been described by one critic as having "revolutionized landscape prints."

== Bokashi ==
Given the lack of colour contrast in the monochromatic aizuri-e, late Edo artists began to experiment with techniques to increase image complexity. This led to the development of bokashi, a printing technique which allowed for the reproduction and mixing of differing colour tones within a single image. This is achieved through carefully graded applications of water and pigment mixtures to the woodblock with a hake brush. The result is a single-coloured print characterised by shading and tonality. It was practiced most effectively in the rendering of skies and water. While aizuri-e themselves were inexpensive to print, bokashi was costly. It is therefore generally seen in formal prints, and not regularly seen in cheaper media such as uchiwa-e. Kunisada has, however, used the technique on this fan print, most notably in the cloud and ground regions, where the value of the blue pigment deepens from very pale blue to near-black opacity.

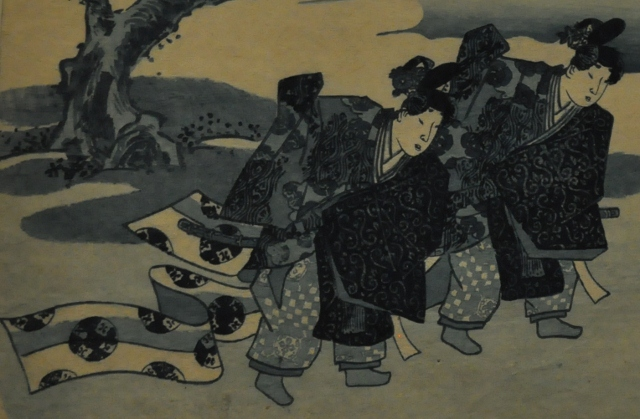
Detail of two dancing figures

== Utagawa Kunisada ==
=== Biography ===
Utagawa Kunisada (歌川国貞) was born in 1786 in the Honjō district of Edo (present-day Tokyo) into a wealthy family of ferry service owners. He began an apprenticeship with the head of the prestigious Utagawa school of artists, Toyokuni I, in 1807, and took the artist name Kunisada to include the second character (国 – kuni) of his mentor's name. In 1844, Kunisada succeeded his master as Toyokuni III (三代歌川豊国).

Kunisada emerged as a book illustrator in 1807 with the series "Twelve Hours of the Courtesans" (Keisei jūnitoki). Kuchi-e book illustrations were essential to the success of the then popular sharebon and kibyōshi books, and this soon became a lucrative market for Kunisada due to his talent and ambition. His position within the Utagawa studio afforded him access to training from the finest masters, and connections to publishers, actors, theatres and poet's associations. This, in turn, led to many commissions. By the early 1810s, he had opened his own studio, and demand for his illustrations had outstripped that for his master's. His great success was also reputedly linked to his "convivial and balanced demeanor, and [the fact that] he delivered his commissions on time."

Kunisada was "without a doubt... the most prolific and successful print artist of all time." He was incredibly prodigious, creating between 35 and 40 thousand designs for individual ukiyo-e prints during his lifetime. His studio was larger than that of any other print artist, and he had a large stable of several dozen students. As a further indication of his unprecedented success, when he died in 1865 after having headed the Utagawa school for around 40 years, he was the subject of four separate shini-e memorial portraits. He is buried on the grounds of Banshōin Kōunji Temple in present-day Nakano ward, Tokyo, alongside Toyokuni I (1769–1825) and Kunisada II (1823–1880).

=== Names ===
Like many artists of the Edo period, Kunisada was associated with a number of names throughout his lifetime.

==== Personal names ====
- Tsunoda Shōgorō IX (角田庄五朗) – official birth name
- Tsunoda Shōzō (角田庄蔵) – common name from birth
- Yanagishima Toyokuni (柳島豊国) – adult nickname related to area of residence
- Houkuin Teishougasen Shinji – posthumous Buddhist name

==== Professional names ====
- Utagawa (歌川) – art surname
- Kunisada (国貞) – artist name (1807–1843)
- Toyokuni III (三代目豊国) – artist name (1844–1865)
- Hanabusa Ittai (英一珪) – painting artist name (1820s–1858)
- Gototei (五渡亭) – gō art name (1811–1845)
- Gepparō (月波楼) – gō (c. 1811–1813)
- Ichiyūsai (一雄斎) – gō (1811–1817)
- Kinraisha (琴雷舎) – gō (1813 – c. 1817)
- Oukamuse – gō (c. 1821–1822)
- Kōchōrō (香蝶楼) – gō (1824–1861)
- Tōjuen – gō (1827–1830)
- Bukiyō Matahei (不器用又平) – shunga gō (1830s)
- Ichiyōsai (一陽斎) – gō (1844–1861)
- Hokubaiko (北梅戸) – gō (c. 1845)
- Kokuteisha Toyokuni (国貞舎豊国) – gō (1847–1851)
- Fuchōan (富眺庵) – gō (c. 1853–58)
- Fuchōsanjin (富眺山人) – gō (dates unknown)
- Hinashi/ Hinaji Toyokuni (雛獅豊国) – gō (1858–1859)

=== Works ===
Although Kunisada designed many surimono and fan pictures, most of his works are in the ōban format. He also produced over sixty paintings.

Given his incredible output, it is not surprising that Kunisada was active in various genres, including kabuki-e and yakusha-e (kabuki actor pictures), bijin-ga (pictures of beauties), yūrei-zu (ghost pictures), sumō-e (sumo wrestler pictures), shunga (erotica), musha-e (warrior prints), and uchiwa-e. He is also credited with popularizing Genji-e, a print genre related to the 11th century novel The Tale of Genji, through his 1829–1842 book series, Nise Murasaki inaka Genji (A Country Genji by a Fake Murasaki). In 1808, he began creating yakusha-e, and these were to become the mainstay of his production, making up 60 to 70% of his total works. So prolific was he, that he came to be known as "Kunisada, the Portraitist of Actors (yakusha-e no Kunisada)."

Two popular genres which are under-represented in Kunisada's oeuvre are nature images (kachō-e/ 花鳥絵) and landscapes (fūkei-e/ 風景絵). He rarely designed pure landscapes, but began in the 1820s or 1830s to incorporate landscape elements into prints featuring beautiful women and actors. "Fan Print with two Bugaku Dancers" with its spare background landscape, is an example of this type of piece.

=== Reputation ===
Despite his success during his own period, Kunisada was not highly regarded in the west until quite recently. Critics today consider Kunisada to have been "a trendsetter... in tune with the tastes of urban society," and credit him with a "more humanized" style than his contemporaries, and with bringing a sense of realism to ukiyo-e, particularly in his depiction of the female form. Many argue, however, that the quality of Kunisada's later works degraded into "gaudy and ostentatious" use of colour, and "lost... elegance in the human figure". Ukiyo-e specialist Rupert Faulkner is particularly scathing, asserting that Kunisada's work "became noticeably coarser and somewhat clumsy, revealing a cheap and gaudy caricaturism of grotesque facial expressions and exaggerated poses." It has been suggested that his production generally suffered "because of over-production and lowering of artistic standards," as well as possible mental or physical health issues, which led to Kunisada becoming a near-recluse in 1847. As art historian J. Hillier notes, "Kunisada's career tells the tragedy of the downfall of ukiyo-e. With evident talent and tremendous verve, his early prints have qualities that link him with the great days of the school, but the great mass of his prints are hastily designed, over-coloured and badly printed."

== Fan Print ==
=== Image ===
The scene depicted on the fan is of two male bugaku dancers in full ceremonial costume, who appear to be performing a dance in lock-step with no audience in evidence. Bugaku, made up of the characters for 'dance' (舞-bu) and 'music' or 'entertainment' (楽-gaku), joined Japanese culture from China, Korea, India and Southeast Asia in the late 8th century, as a form of dance performed at the imperial court, as well as at temples and shrines. Dancers assume stylized hand, arm and foot poses accompanied by drumming and the world's oldest surviving orchestral music, gagaku. Bugaku is often performed by dancers wearing masks to represent fictional characters, though not in Kunisada's print. There are four bugaku genres: civil, warrior, children's, and running dances. The figures here appear to be performing the latter.

From the late 1820s, Kunisada began studying painting under Hanabusa Ikkei (英一珪), master of the Itchō school. The art-name appearing on this print, "Kōchōrō" (香蝶楼), borrows characters from his teacher's pseudonym (Shinkō) and from the name of the school's founder, Hanabusa Itchō (英一蝶). Both of these artists painted bugaku scenes prior to "Fan Print with two Bugaku Dancers," which are very different in style from Kunisada's image.

=== Signature ===
The print is signed near the right edge of the fan. It reads vertically from right to left and top to bottom as follows:

- Line 1: Ōju (応需) – a prefix meaning "by special request," suggesting it may have been commissioned
- Line 2: Kōchōrō (香蝶楼) – an art-name (gō) used 1825–1861, mainly on non-actor prints.
- Line 3: Kunisada ga (国貞画) – artist name used 1807–1843, followed by 'picture' (i.e. 'by Kunisada')
- End of line 3: double circular toshidama-in (年玉印) seal

=== Toshidama ===
The double circle mark below Kunisada's signature is a toshidama-in, the distinctive seal used by all generations of the Utagawa school after Toyokuni I first adopted it, for reasons unknown, in 1808 or 1809. It is a lucky symbol, referencing gifts of coins given to children at New Year's. Kunisada gave the mark his own unique twist, elongating it and making it a yellow frame with red infill containing his signature. From 1850, he used this cartouche-style almost exclusively.

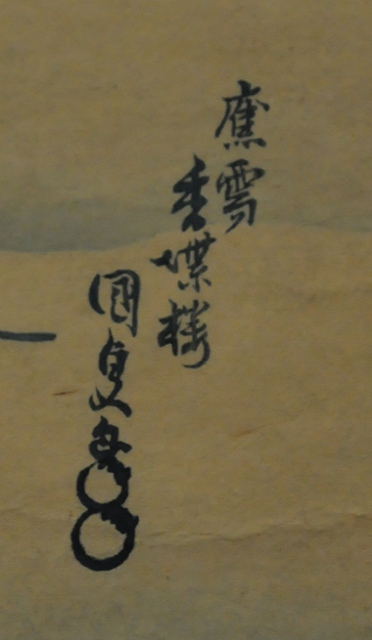
Title and signature

=== Date ===
The ROM dates the print to sometime between the mid-1820s and 1844; however, there are indications that the date can be narrowed to between 1830 and 1843. Synthetic blue pigment was not introduced to Japan until 1829, and it is unlikely that expensive natural indigo would be used on a medium as cheap as uchiwa-e. Kunisada's signature is flanked by two circular toshidama-in seals rather than appearing within an oblong, stylized toshidama cartouche. This suggests the print belongs to his early career.

=== Provenance ===
The print was donated to the ROM by Sir Edmund Walker (1848–1924), who was the long-time president of the Canadian Bank of Commerce, and served as the first chairman of the board of trustees for the ROM. Walker began collecting Japanese art in the 1870s, making him one of the earliest collectors in North America. He bought many of his pieces in New York between 1873 and 1875 and 1881–1886, and during a trip to London in 1909. In 1919, after travelling to Japan, China and Korea, he was named Honorary Consul-General of Japan for Toronto.

=== Print details ===
- Size: ōban
- Format: uchiwa-e
- Title: none indicated
- Subject: Two male bugaku dancers performing in a landscape defined by two trees
- Signature: 応需 / 香蝶楼 / 国貞画 (ōju / Kōchōrō / Kunisada ga)
- Seal: double toshidama-in
- Publisher: none indicated
- Censor seals: none
- Date seal: none
- Genre: uchiwa-e, aizuri-e
- Condition: Four circular holes on right edge of paper suggesting previous inclusion in a book; some minor creases and stains
- Provenance: Sir Edmund Walker Collection

== See also ==
- Princess Takamado
- Spring and autumn landscapes (Hara Zaishō) – items in same gallery
- Unit 88-9 (Kiyomizu Masahiro) – item in same gallery
- Female Ghost (Kunisada) – print in same collection
- Eijudō Hibino at Seventy-one (Toyokuni I) – print in same collection
- Ichikawa Omezō as a Pilgrim and Ichikawa Yaozō as a Samurai (Toyokuni I) – print in same gallery
- Bust portrait of Actor Kataoka Ichizō I (Gochōtei Sadamasu II) – print in same gallery
- View of Tempōzan Park in Naniwa (Gochōtei Sadamasu) – print in same gallery
