= Fushiga =

Satirical genre of ukiyo-e woodblock prints

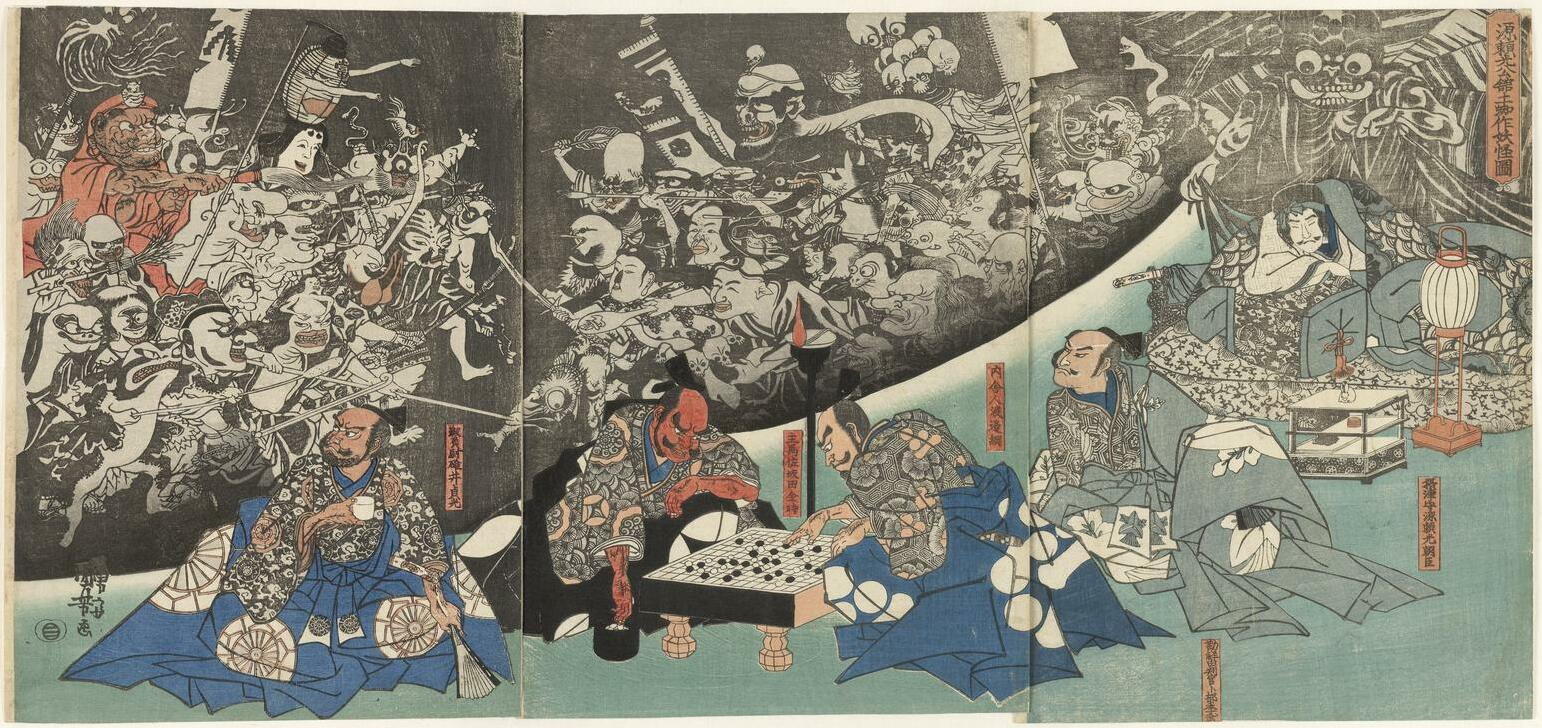
Utagawa Kuniyoshi's Prince Minamoto Yorimitsu Encounters the Earth Spider Demon (1843)

Fushiga (Japanese: 風刺画, lit. 'satirical caricature') is a genre of ukiyo-e woodblock prints depicting satirical pictures accompanied by text. Fushiga prints usually depicted ordinary people in their everyday activities, with their exclamations written next to them, and not celebrities or famous landscapes. Fushiga relied more on text than on the image, and because of that was "virtually ignored by Western critics of the print".

== History ==
The genre emerged as an attempt at criticism of the government and social situations of the late Tokugawa regime in the 1860s, many prints were very political and were not signed. "An ordinary-looking picture of Edoites flying kites could thus be transformed into a sharp commentary on inflation, with the kites bearing the names of basic commodities, and the text complaining about how things are going up and up."

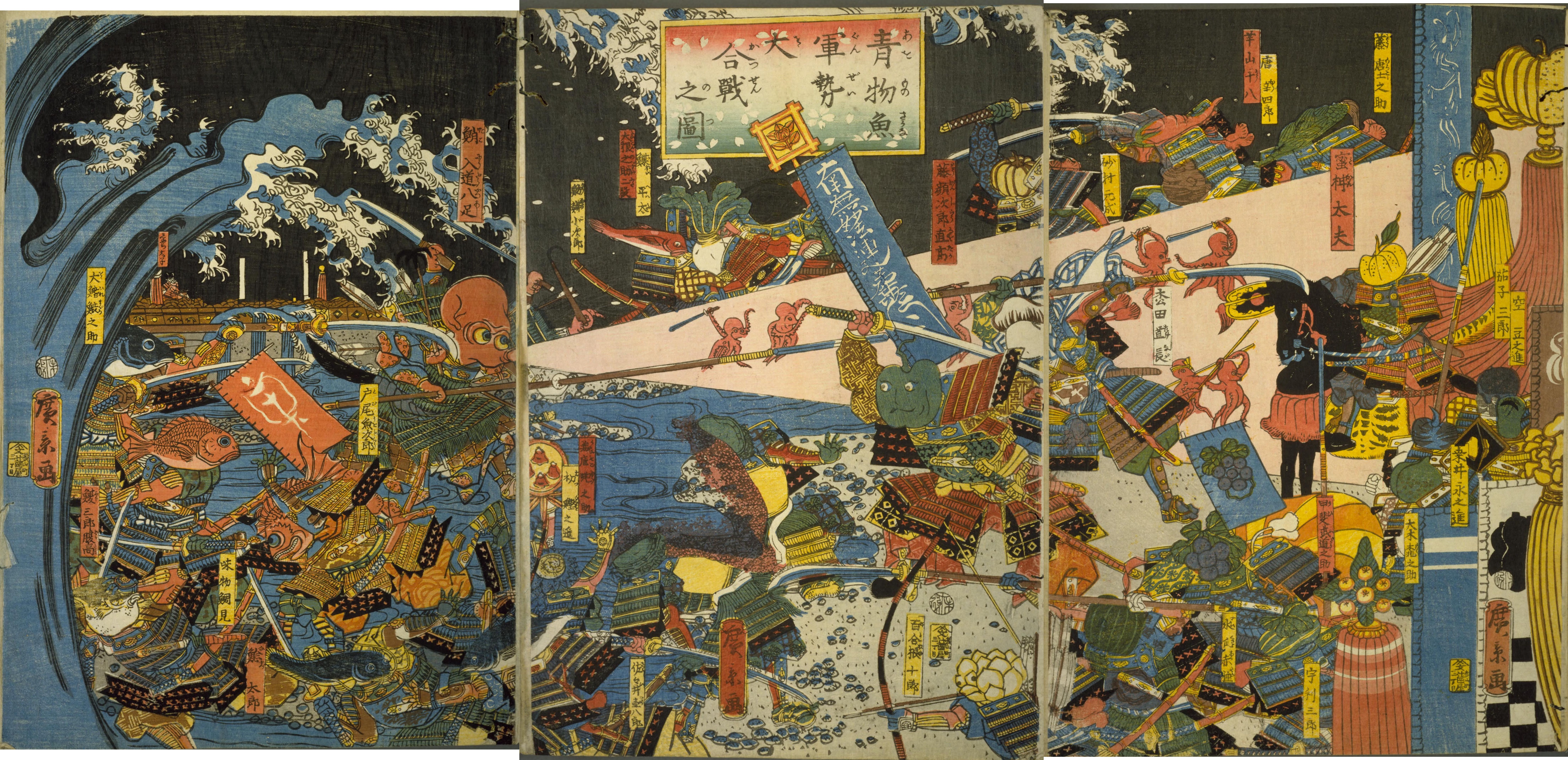
The great battle between the fruit and vegetable army and the fish troops, 1859 by Utagawa Hirokage

Kyu Hyun Kim writes that some prints, for example Utagawa Kuniyoshi's Prince Minamoto Yorimitsu Encounters the Earth Spider Demon (1843), were "purported to depict mythical heroes from kabuki plays, who were in fact identifiable to contemporaries as satirical representations of real-life shogunate officials and domain lords". Another example is The great battle between the fruit and vegetable army and the fish troops, 1859 by Utagawa Hirokage, that appears to be:

at first glance to be commenting on the rising price of fruit and vegetables and the falling price of fish following the cholera epidemic of 1858. However, the back of the print in the Waseda University Collection displays "identification tags" matched to various anthropomorphic foodstuffs, informing the reader how each funnily-dressed vegetable, fruit, or marine animal represents a specific domain or daimyo. The commanding officer of the fruit and vegetables is shown to have a head made of a tangerine, the "national product" of Kii domain, from which the fourteenth Shogun Tokugawa Iemochi hailed. A winter melon represents Ii Naosuke, his finger branded with a Hikone domain crest. Daikon, the large Japanese turnip, is a special product of Owari domain. The opposing army of marine creatures is headed by a grampus, signifying Hitotsubashi (Tokugawa) Yoshinobu, flanked by Abe Masahiro as a puffer-fish, fugu in Japanese (a pun on Abe's fief, Fukuyama), and Hotta Masayoshi as a sea bass (the sea bass's sleeves carry cherry blossom [sakura] designs, a take on Hotta's fief, Sakura). A gigantic octopus shooting off a beam of light from the depth of the ocean like some monster from a 1950s science fiction film is Tokugawa Nariaki (apparently one of the products the Mito domain was known for was octopus, according to Minami Kazuo).

There were attempts by the shogunate to limit and control such prints, but they were not very successful. Government sanctioned and punished for the production of such prints. For example Utagawa Kuniyoshi was arrested and interrogated for his print Kitai na meii nanbyō chiryō (The Rare and Brilliant Doctor Treats Tough Diseases, 1850), "features a female doctor named Kogarashi treating a motley crew of patients with comically exaggerated illnesses. One of them is a nearsighted old man, who represents Abe Masahiro, grumbling, 'I can see the tip of my nose, but nothing far away.'" Producers were fined, the prints confiscated and destroyed.

== Gallery ==
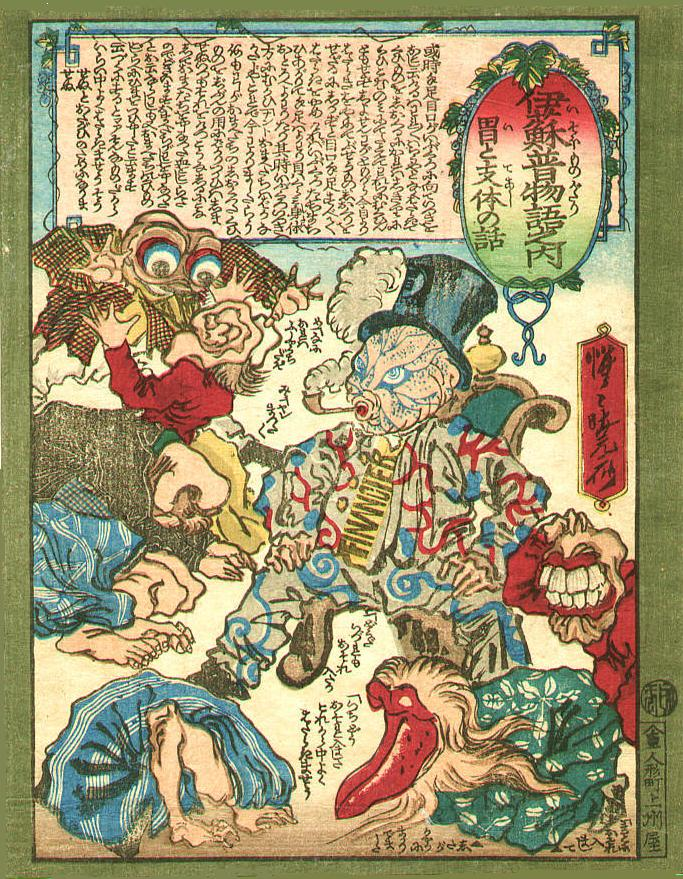
Kawanabe Kyōsai's print "The Lazy One in the Middle", interpretation of Aesop's "The Belly and the Members". Kyosai made the design as a political satire. The stomach has a tie inscribed "Financier" around his neck.

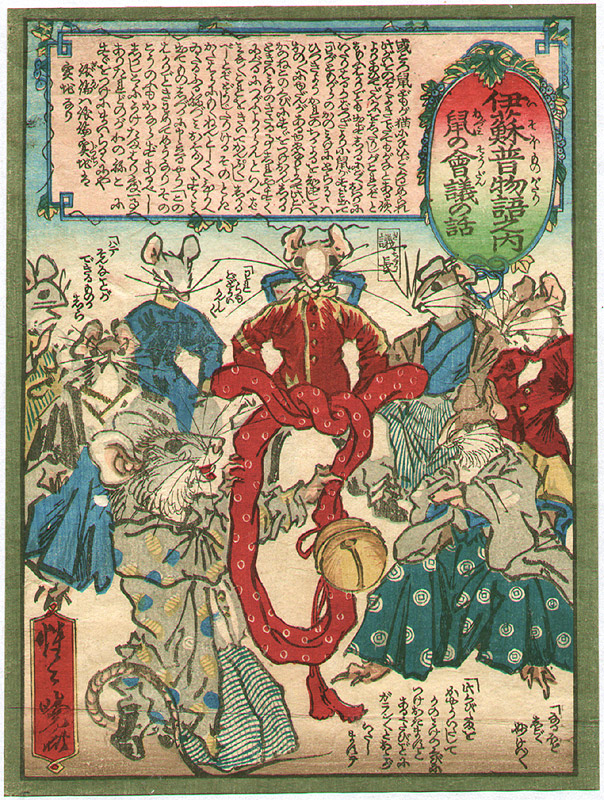
Kawanabe Kyōsai's print "The Mice in Council ("nezumi no sōdan" no hanashi)", 1875

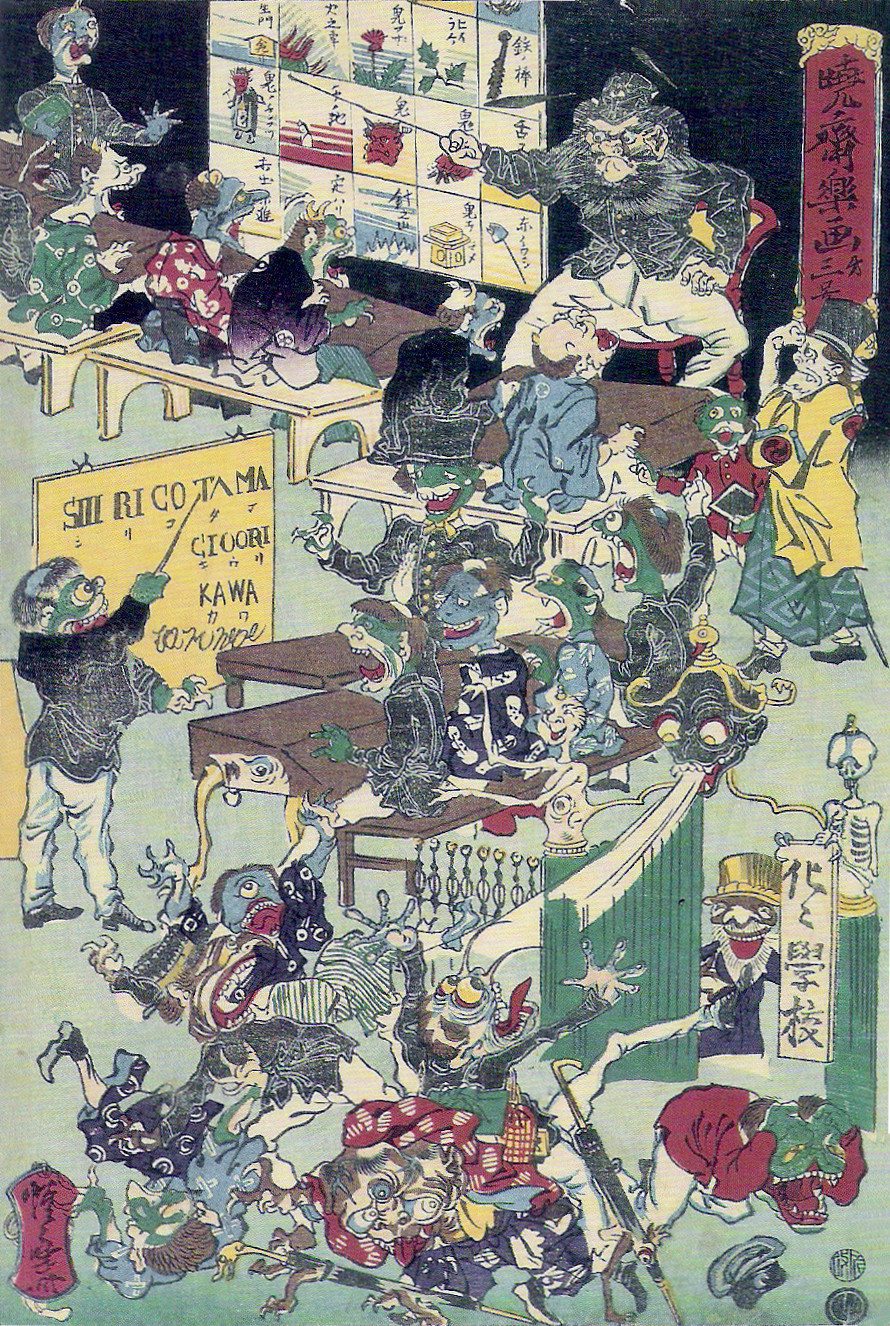
Bake-Bake Gakkō (化々學校), or "School for Spooks", woodblock print by Kyōsai. In August 1872, the Meiji government decided to implement a system of compulsory education. In this caricature, both demons (above) and kappa (center) are learning vocabulary concerning their daily life. The former are taught by Shōki the demon queller, dressed in western-style uniform. Some goblins try to enter the school (below), but are blown away by the Wind God.
