= Egoyomi =

Japanese picture with calendrical marks

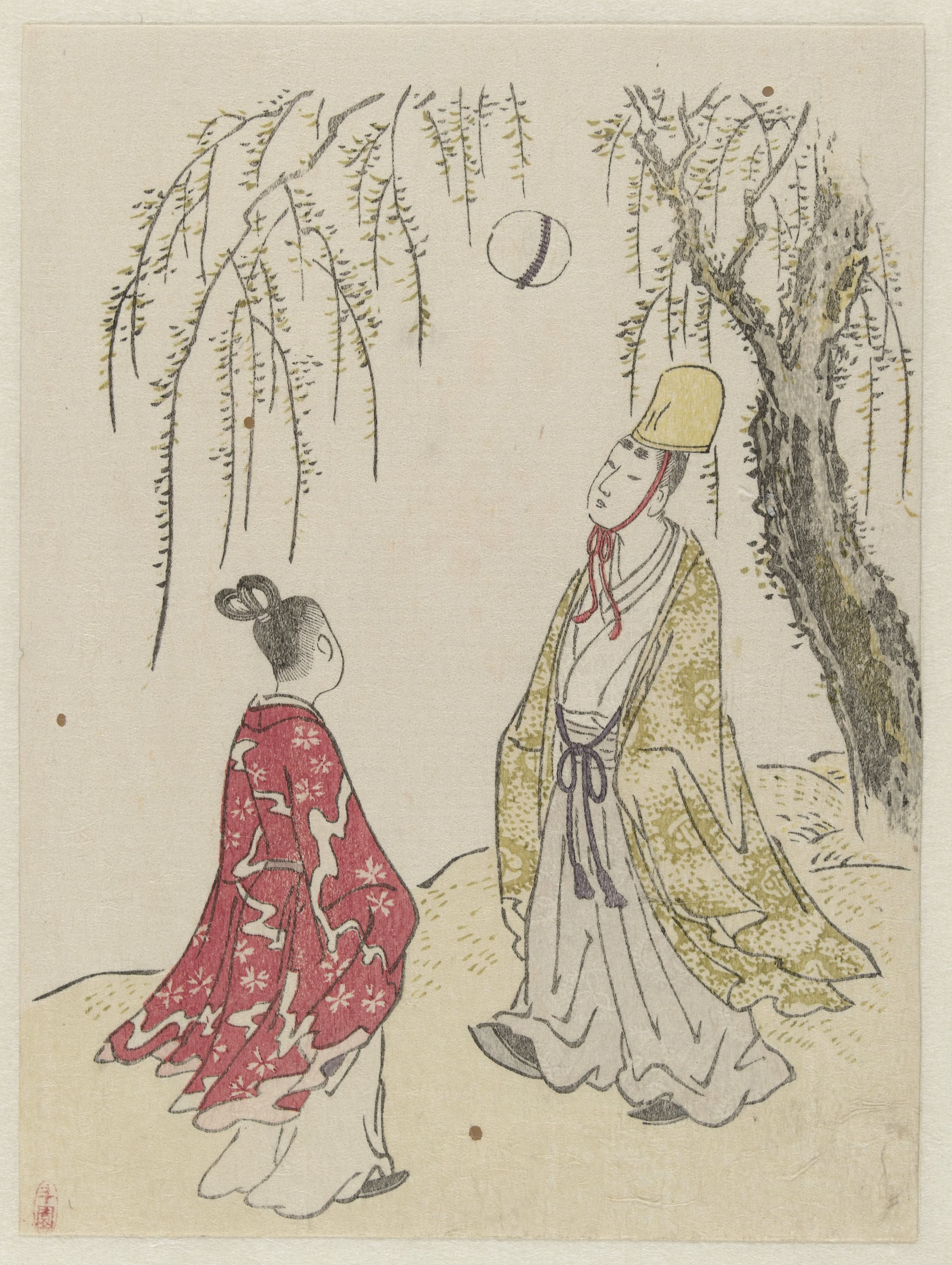
A courtier and boy playing with a ball under a tree. The numbers of the months are on the courtier's cloak.

Egoyomi (盲暦) is a Japanese picture calendar, in which the length and order of the months are deducible, like a code, from cryptic markings that are incomprehensible to most people but transparent to enthusiasts. These types of calendars thrived during the so-called Meiwa era of the late 18th century. This was a period when it was prohibited to make unofficial calendars. Since these kinds of calendars were illegal, it has been claimed that calendar markings that would have indicated the purpose of these pictures as a calendar, were not included. However, the extent to which these pictures misled the authorities is a topic of debate.

These calendar woodblock prints were surimono, privately commissioned and published works not intended for the general public but used within private circles. Eventually, the same pictures reached the public market: the calendar information was carved off the wooden blocks, which were then reprinted and sold.

== See also ==
- Ukiyo-e
- Woodblock printing in Japan
