= Iwai Hanshirō I =

Iwai Hanshirō I (岩井半四郎 (1代目); 1652–1699) was a Japanese kabuki performer, known both for his own work and for his role as the progenitor of a family of kabuki actors from Osaka.

Iwai Hanshirō was a stage name with significant cultural and historical connotations.

In the conservative Kabuki world, stage names are passed from father to son in formal system which converts the kabuki stage name into a mark of accomplishment. This actor passed the mantle of his stage name to his artistic heirs.

Lineage of Iwai stage names

- Iwai Hanshirō I (1652–1699)
- Iwai Hanshirō II (d. 1710)
- Iwai Hanshirō III (1698–1760)
- Iwai Hanshirō IV (1747–1800)
- Iwai Hanshirō V (1776–1847)
- Iwai Hanshirō VI (1799–1836)
- Iwai Hanshirō VII (1804–1845)
- Iwai Hanshirō VIII (1829–1882)
- Iwai Hanshirō IX (1882–1945)
- Iwai Hanshirō X (1927-2011)
- Iwai Hanshiro(2021 - )

== See also ==
- Shūmei
