= Iemon =

- Pronunciation: ĺ-é-mon
- Gender: Male

Origin
- Origin: Japanese
- Meaning: It can have many different meanings depending on the kanji used.

Iemon or Yemon (いえもん, イエモン) is an ancient Japanese given name for men. The name originally came from the word Uemonfu (右衛門府) which is the right guardhouse of the gates of Heian-kyō imperial palace during the Asuka period and Heian period.

In addition to hiragana and katakana, Iemon can be written using different kanji characters (伊右衛門 or 猪右衛門).

== People ==
- Iemon (伊右衛門 or 猪右衛門), an alternate name of Yamauchi Kazutoyo

== Fictional characters ==
- Tamiya Iemon (伊右衛門), a main character in Yotsuya Kaidan, a ghost story
  - The main character in Crest of Betrayal, a 1994 Japanese film adaptation of Yotsuya Kaidan
  - A main character in Ayakashi: Samurai Horror Tales, an animated horror anthology television series featuring an adaptation of Yotsuya Kaidan
- Iemon, a minor character who appears in the video game and subsequent anime series Tales of the Abyss

== Other uses ==
- Iemon (伊右衛門), a brand of green tea drink released by Suntory and tea company Fukujyuen
- Yemon (イエモン), an abbreviation of the Japanese rock band The Yellow Monkey
