= Jōge-e =

Japanese woodblock prints

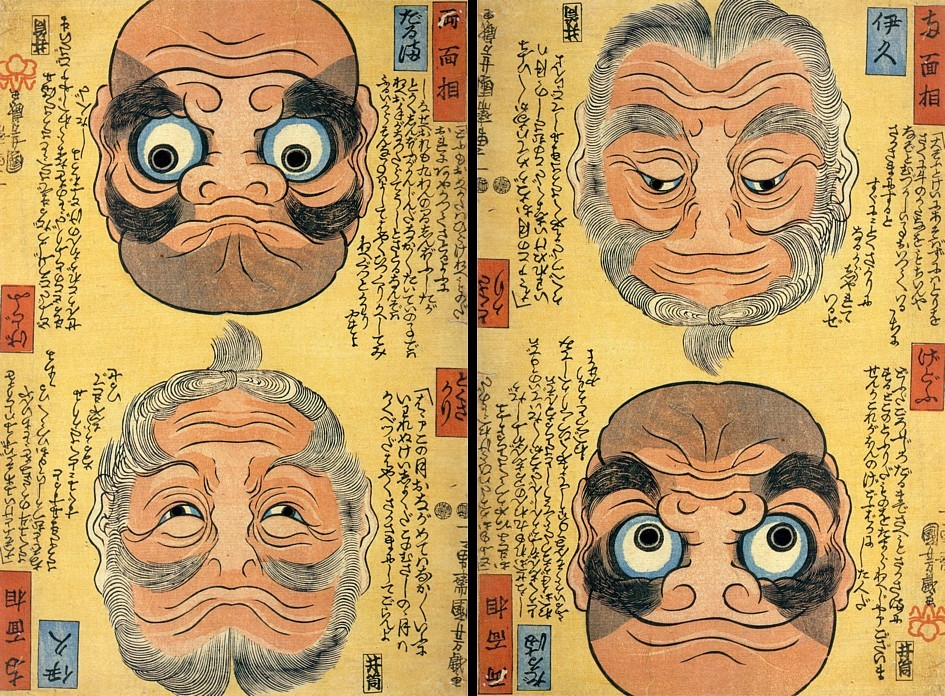
An example image from 1852, with both perspectives provided

Joge-e (上下絵) are special playful images that were often created in the Meiji era in Japan. These images can be viewed from the top, or the bottom. Each viewing angle enables the viewer to see a different image.
