= Iwai Hanshirō V =

Iwai Hanshirō V in onnagata costume. 7 1/4 × 8 3/8 in. (18.4 × 21.3 cm), woodblock print by Utagawa Kuniyasu, c. 1823 -- from the collection of the Metropolitan Museum of Art, New York

Iwai Hanshirō V (岩井半四郎 (5代目); 1776–1847) was a Japanese kabuki performer, known both for his work and for his place in the lineage of a family of kabuki actors in Edo during the Edo period. He was the son of Iwai Hanshirō IV.

Iwai Hanshirō was a stage name with significant cultural and historical connotations.

In the conservative Kabuki world, stage names are passed from father to son in formal system which converts the kabuki stage name into a mark of accomplishment. This actor assumed the mantle of his father's stage name in 1804.

Lineage of Iwai stage names

- Iwai Hanshirō I (1652–1699)
- Iwai Hanshirō II (d. 1710)
- Iwai Hanshirō III (1698–1760)
- Iwai Hanshirō IV (1747–1800)
- Iwai Hanshirō V (1776–1847)
- Iwai Hanshirō VI (1799–1836)
- Iwai Hanshirō VII (1804–1845)
- Iwai Hanshirō VIII (1829–1882)
- Iwai Hanshirō IX (1882–1945)
- Iwai Hanshirō X (1927-2011)
- Iwai Hanshiro (2021 - )

== See also ==
- Shūmei
