= Aka-e =

Japanese woodblock prints

An aka-e (赤絵 "red picture") is a type of ukiyo-e that is printed entirely or predominantly in red. Aka-e were said to be talismans against smallpox, especially when they bore images of Shōki the demon queller. A woodblock print having a significant portion of the design entirely in red may also be considered to be an aka-e.

== Gallery ==
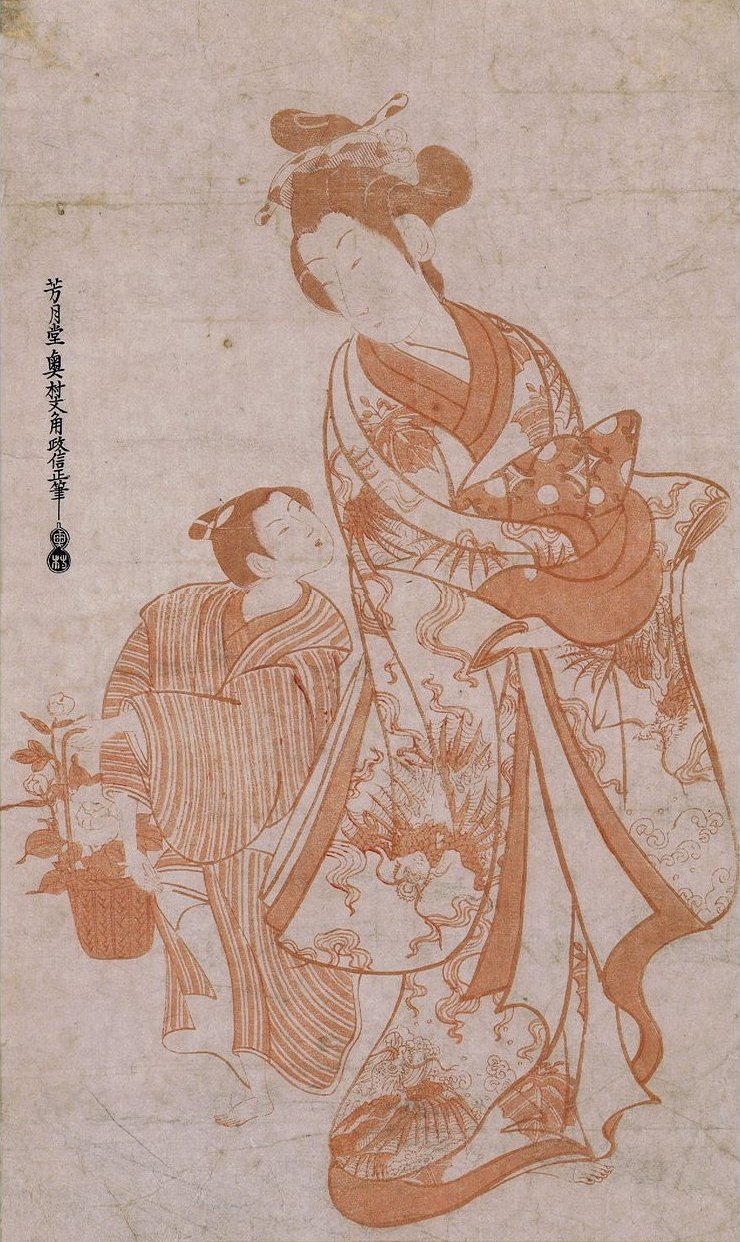
Courtesan and Boy Flower Seller, an aka-e by Okumura Masanobu, c. 1730s

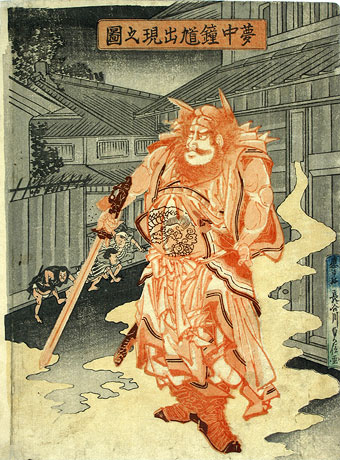
Shōki Appearing in a Dream (Muchû Shôki shutsugen no zu), a chûban an aka-e by Sadanobu Hasegawa I, c. 1840
