= Uchiwa-e =

Japanese woodblock prints

Uchiwa-e (団扇絵) are a genre of Japanese ukiyo-e woodblock print, which appear on rigid, paddle-shaped hand fans known as uchiwa (団扇). Ovoid images matching the outline of uchiwa were printed on rectangular sheets of washi rice paper, then cut along the margins and pasted onto a skeletal bamboo frame.

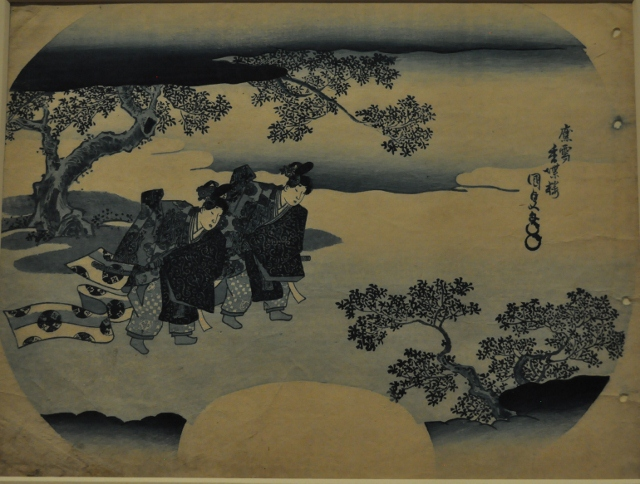
Late Edo period uchiwa-e print of bugaku dancers

== Uchiwa characteristics ==
Unlike folding hand fans, which originated in Japan in the 6th or 7th century, non-folding flat, oval or "bean-shaped" uchiwa were a Chinese import. In terms of popular usage, uchiwa had a close connection with Edo urban culture which gained momentum during the seventeenth and eighteenth centuries. Folding fans, known as ōgi (扇), suehiro (末広) or sensu (扇子), remained the dominant accessory within the realm of the sophisticated court culture prevailing in Kyoto at the time.

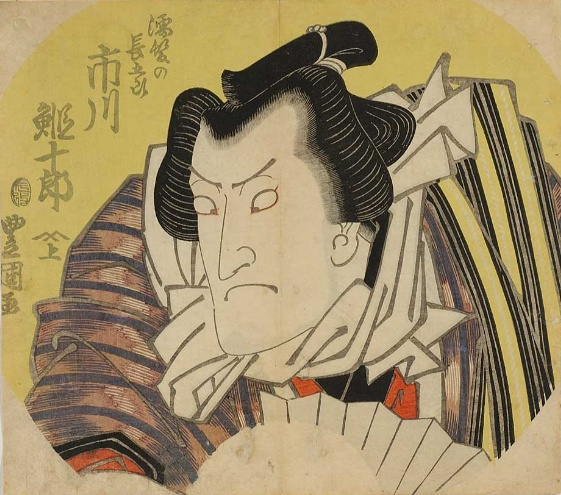
The actor Ichikawa Ebijuro I by Toyokuni I

Historically, uchiwa were an ostensibly feminine accessory, with men more typically carrying folding fans. They were simultaneously fashion accessories and functional items for daily use. They are strongly associated with summer, having been sold only during the summer months, and often decorated with summer imagery. At least one critic argues that, due to their use by women during periods of intense heat, uchiwa "can have suggestive connotations."

Uchiwa are used by many today as devices for personal cooling, as well as for fanning rice to cool it in the preparation of sushi. More ceremonially, they can still be seen in a number of contexts, including a variety of summer dance performances and as an accessory carried by referees during sumo matches.

== Uchiwa-e history ==
Uchiwa with printed designs were first produced in Japan sometime in or prior to the 1680s. One of the earliest extant examples is a 1684 ehon (picture book) by Hishikawa Moronobu (菱川師宣) entitled Uchiwazukushi (Uchiwa Pictures of Every Variety), which includes illustrations within fan-shaped frames. Other notable examples placing uchiwa-e within a socio-historical context are prints by Suzuki Harunobu (鈴木春信) from 1767 or 1768 featuring uchiwa uri (fan sellers), and an 1814 print by Utagawa Kunisada depicting kabuki actor Ichikawa Dannosuke II in the role of a fan vendor.

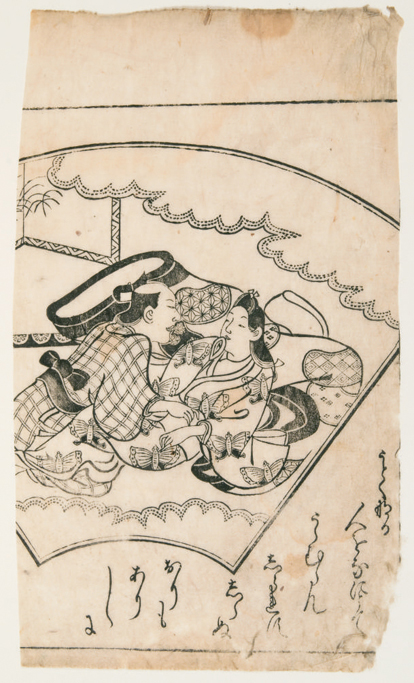
Hishikawa Moronobu - uchiwa-e zukushi

One historical fan vendor whose life is well-recorded is Ebiya Rinnosuke (海老屋林之助; 1832–1895). Ebiya printed and sold both fan and standard-sized prints until around 1895. Although Ebiya's publishing house originally commissioned designs from Utagawa Kunisada and Utagawa Kuniyoshi exclusively, they expanded their roster to include other artists from the late 1850s.

During the 19th century, the production of uchiwa-e and ōgi-e prints was under the strict control of a guild of fan publishers operating under a system of rules and regulations different from those applying to regular published prints. Beginning in 1815 and lasting to the end of the Edo period (1603-1868), fan prints were commonly marked with seals indicating their year of publication.

== Examples ==
Most, if not all, major Edo period woodblock print artists worked within the uchiwa-e medium in addition to with standard prints and illustrated books. Uchiwa-e designs fall into all of the major categories of prints, including yakusha-e (actor prints), bijin-ga (beauties), fūkei-ga (landscapes), kachō-ga (nature prints) and musha-e (warrior prints). Some notable uchiwa-e works which survive in collections today are by Katsukawa Shunshō (1726–1793), Utagawa Toyokuni (1769–1825), Kunisada (1786–1865), Kuniyoshi (1797–1861) and Hiroshige (1797-1858).

Uchiwa are by definition accessories intended for practical, everyday use. As a result of their frequent handling, few pristine mounted examples of uchiwa-e remain. For this reason, art historian Amy Reigle Newland has suggested that uchiwa-e "are probably among the most elusive of all categories of ukiyo-e prints to study and collect."

== See also ==
- Fan print with two bugaku dancers (Kunisada)
