= Megane-e =

Japanese woodblock prints

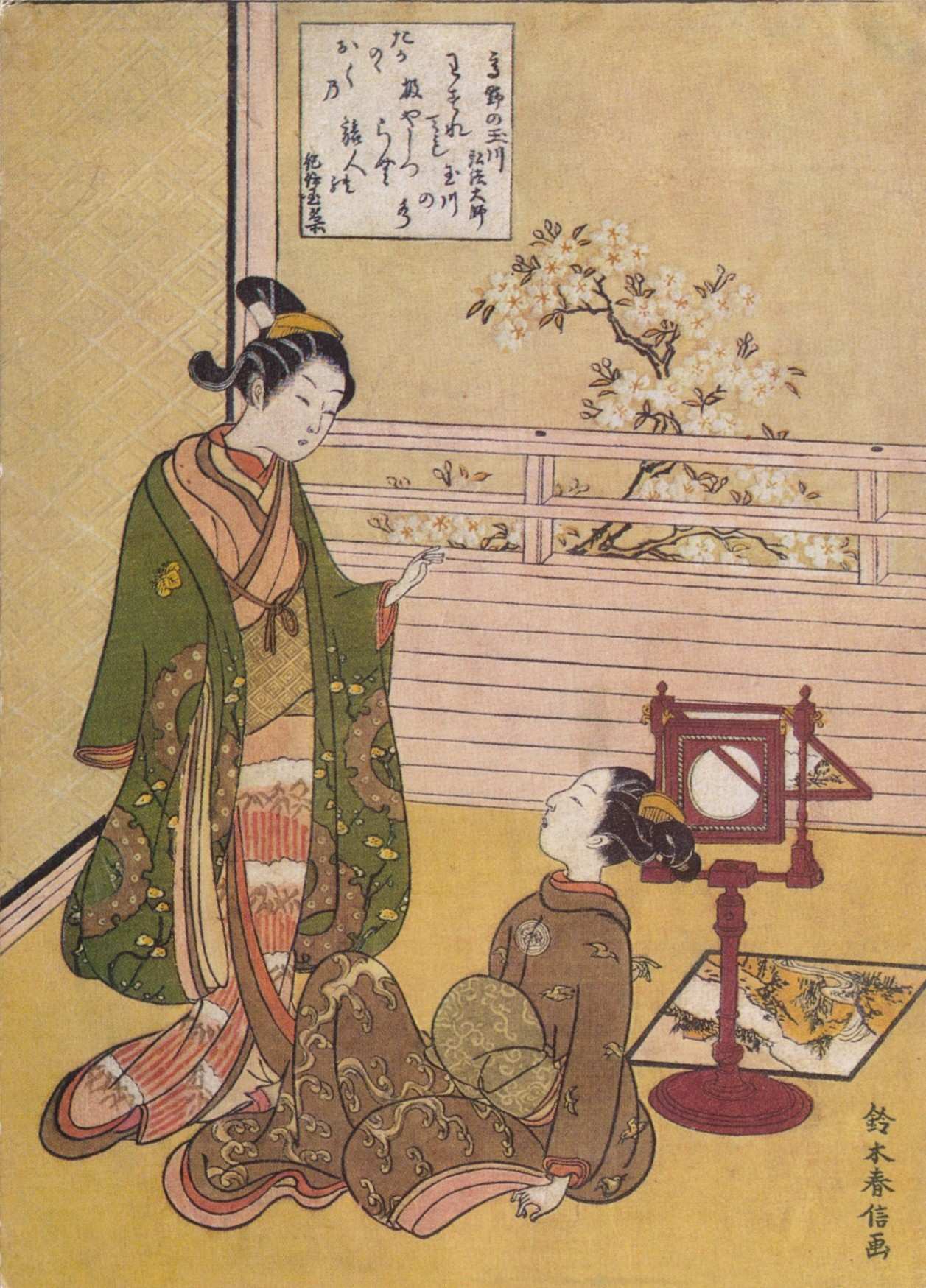
Some young women using a megane-e device Harunobu, c. 1760s

In Japanese art, a megane-e (眼鏡絵, 'optique picture') is a print designed using graphical perspective techniques and viewed through a convex lens to produce a three-dimensional effect. The term derives from the French vue d'optique. The device used to view them was called an Oranda megane (和蘭眼鏡, 'Dutch glasses') or nozoki megane (覗き眼鏡, 'peeping glasses'), and the pictures were also known as karakuri-e (繰絵, 'tricky picture').

Perspective boxes first appeared in Renaissance Europe and were popular until superseded by the stereoscope in the mid-19th century. The Dutch brought the first such device to Japan in the 1640s as a gift to the shōgun. The devices became popular in Japan only after the Chinese popularized them in Japan about 1758, after which they began to influence Japanese artists.

The artist Maruyama Ōkyo (1733–1795) made serious study of imported perspective techniques and applied them to his painting. He gained an interest in making ukiyo-e prints through the artist Utagawa Toyoharu, who produced uki-e 'floating pictures' using linear perspective techniques. Ōkyo is thought to have been inspired by Chinese optical prints produced around 1750, some of which were themselves based on European vues d'optique; he went on to produce facsimile copies and adaptations of such Chinese optical views from Suzhou. Ōkyo began making uki-e prints for viewing through a convex lens: megane-e. Ōkyo later dismissed his megane-e, perhaps because their subjects were of kabuki and the pleasure quarters and thus considered of low artistic value. Prints by artists such as Utamaro and Masanobu depict people enjoying megane-e.
