= Utagawa =

The name Utagawa may refer to:

- The Utagawa school of Japanese woodblock print artists
- One of the artists of the Utagawa school, including:
  - Utagawa Toyoharu (歌川 豊春, 1735–1814)
  - Utagawa Toyokuni (歌川 豊国, 1769–1825)
  - Utagawa Hiroshige (歌川 広重, 1797–1858), also known as Andō Hiroshige
  - Utagawa Kunisada (歌川 国貞, 1786–1865), also known as Utagawa Toyokuni III
  - Utagawa Kuniyoshi (歌川 國芳, 1797–1861)
  - Utagawa Kunimasa (歌川 国政, 1773–1810)
  - Utagawa Toyohiro (歌川豊広, 歌川豐廣, 1773–1828)
  - Utagawa Kunisada II (歌川 国貞, 1823–1880)
- Tatsuo Utagawa (宇田川 竜男, 1917–2006), Japanese ornithologist and academic
- Utagawa Yoan (宇田川 榕菴, 1798–1846), Japanese scholar of Western Studies
