= Art name =

Professional name used by East Asian artists

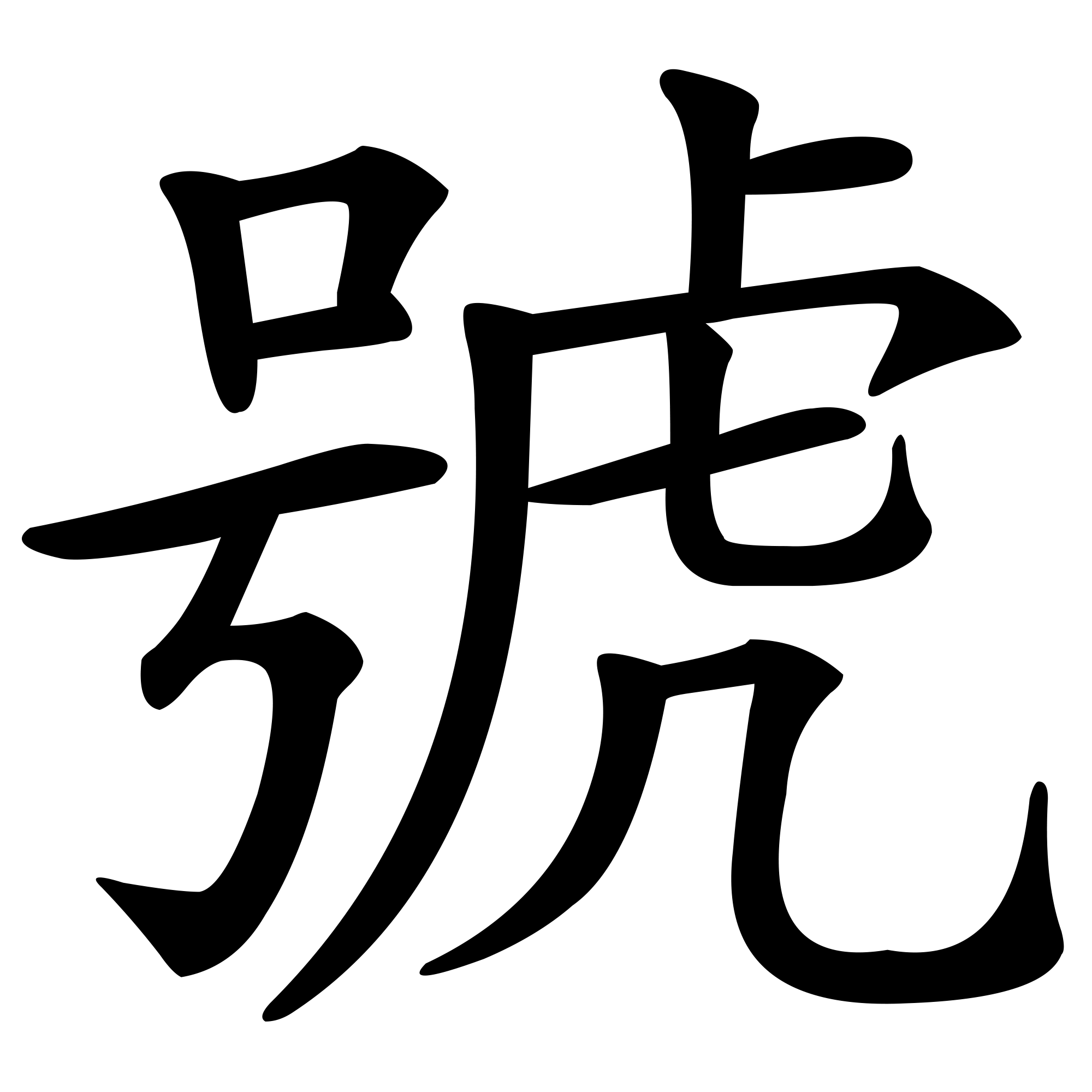

Chinese name
- Traditional Chinese: 號
- Simplified Chinese: 号
- Literal meaning: "mark"
Transcriptions
Standard Mandarin
- Hanyu Pinyin: hào
- Wade–Giles: hao

Vietnamese name
- Vietnamese alphabet: tên hiệu
- Hán-Nôm: 𠸛號

Korean name
- Hangul: 호
- Hanja: 號
Transcriptions
- Revised Romanization: ho
- McCune–Reischauer: ho

Japanese name
- Kana: ごう (modern usage) がう (historical usage)
- Kyūjitai: 號
- Shinjitai: 号
Transcriptions
- Romanization: gō

An art name, also variously translated as a style name, pseudonym, or pen name and also known directly by its native names hào (in Mandarin Chinese), gō (in Japanese), ho (in Korean), and tên hiệu (in Vietnamese), is a professional name used by artists, poets, and writers in the Sinosphere. The word and the concept originated in China, where it was used as nicknames for the educated, then became popular in other East Asian countries, especially Japan, Korea, Vietnam, and the former Kingdom of Ryukyu.

In some cases, artists adopted different pseudonyms at different stages of their career, usually to mark significant changes in their life. Extreme practitioners of this tendency were Tang Yin of the Ming dynasty, who had more than ten hao, Hokusai of Japan, who in the period 1798 to 1806 alone used no fewer than six, and Kim Chŏnghŭi of the Joseon Dynasty who had up to 503.

== History ==
=== China ===
In Chinese culture, Hao refers to honorific names made by oneself or given by others when one is in middle age. After one's gaining the Hao, other persons may then call such a person by one's Hao even without such a person being presented. (Note: Calling someone's name other than Hao (i.e. infant name, first name, last name, Zi) without such a person's presentation is seen to be impolite.) Hao usually is made by a person oneself, but sometimes is given by a high-ranked official or even is bestowed by the monarch.

The use of this name as a nom de plume or artistic name, however, appears to have begun only during the Six Dynasties period, with Tao Yuanming and Ge Hong among the first literati to have given themselves Hao.

Art names came into vogue during the Tang dynasty, during which time they could either be coined by the persons themselves, or given to them as a name by others. Most Hao can be placed within a few categories:

- Hao derived from the locations or characteristics of the person's residence. For instance, Tao Yuanming was Wuliu Xiansheng, "Mister Five-Willows", while Su Shi was Dongpo Jushi, "Householder of the Eastern Slope", after his residence while exiled in Huangzhou. These were mostly self-coined.
- Hao derived from certain well known sayings by the person. For example, Ouyang Xiu was known as Liuyi Jushi, "Householder of the Six Ones", after his self description as "One myriad books, one thousand inscriptions, one qin, one game of chess, one flask of wine and one old man".
- Hao derived from one's famous poetic lines or images. These were most often given by others in admiration. Li Bai, for his free-spirited behaviour, was known as Zhe Xianren, "Banished Immortal"; while the poet He Zhu was known as He Meizi, "He the Plum", after an acclaimed line about yellow plums.
- Hao derived from one's official posts, birthplace, or a place where they served as officials. Du Fu was known as Du Gongbu, "Du of the Ministry of Works", having briefly been a senior officer in that ministry. Tang Xianzu was called "Tang of Nanhai" for his birthplace.

By the Song dynasty, the majority of literati called each other by their art names, which in turn often changed; this situation continued up to the 20th century.

=== Japan ===
In early modern Japan, a woodblock print artist's first gō was usually given to them by the head of the school (a group of artists and apprentices, with a senior as master of the school) in which they initially studied; this gō usually included one of the characters of the master's gō. For example, one of Hokusai's earliest pseudonyms was Shunrō; his master Katsukawa Shunshō having granted him the character 'shun' from his own name.

One can often trace the relationship among artists with this, especially in later years, when it seems to have been fairly (although not uniformly) systematic (particularly in the Utagawa school) that the first character of the pupil's gō was the last of the master's gō.

Thus, an artist named Toyoharu had a student named Toyohiro, who, in turn, had as a pupil the famous landscape artist Hiroshige.

Another figure who studied under Toyoharu was the principal head of the Utagawa school, Toyokuni. Toyokuni had pupils named Kunisada and Kuniyoshi. Kuniyoshi, in turn, had as a student Yoshitoshi, whose pupils included Toshikata.

=== Korea ===
In Korea, these names are called ho (Korean: 호; Hanja: 號). According to the Encyclopedia of Korean Culture, they arrived on the peninsula from China during the Three Kingdoms of Korea period (57 BC – 668 AD). They are now relatively uncommon, although some recent authors use pen names (필명; 筆名; pilmyeong), which are seen as very similar to a subvariant of ho called aho. During deliberations of the Constitutional Court, justices address one another by their ho, rather than by personal names.

People can either create their own ho or it can be given to them by others. Typically people select their own ho based on the meaning of the name. When other people give a person a ho, it typically reflects their shared social context or relationship (parent to child, friend to friend, teacher to student, etc). Names can also be selected to avoid naming taboos.

While most ho are made of two characters, they can be of any length. For example, the poet Kim Sang-ok had one that is ten characters long (칠수삼과처용지거주인; 七須三瓜處容之居主人). A person can also have any number of ho; Kim exemplified this by having over twenty. According to the Encyclopedia of Korean Culture, he had the most art names of any modern Korean poet. An extreme example is that of the Joseon scholar Kim Jeong-hui who, by the estimate of famous calligrapher Oh Je-bong, had as many as 503. Some people change ho to reflect changes in their mood or situation.

Some ho are also exclusively written in the native Korean alphabet Hangul, without corresponding Chinese characters (Hanja). This too could be a symbolic choice. For example, the linguist Lee Byeong-gi chose a pure Hangul name (가람; Garam) in part to reflect his sentiments as a Korean independence activist.

When a person writes an explanation for their ho, the explanation is called a hobyeon (호변; 號辨) or hogi (호기; 號記). A number of texts that catalogue and categorize various ho exist, which are called hobo (호보; 號譜).

==== Types of ho ====
Ho can be subdivided into aho (아호; 雅號) or dangho (당호; 堂號).

Aho are typical art names (pseudonyms for artists, writers, etc).

Dangho refers to the name of the building where an intellectual lives. In other words, intellectuals could be referred to by their house's name (it was once common practice for Korean intellectuals to name their houses). For example, if someone's house was named Ch'unghyodang (충효당) and that person went to the park one day, one could use their dangho as such: "Ch'unghyodang went to the park." This was sometimes convenient to distinguish between people with similar names. While dangho was typically reserved for the owner of the house, it could also be used to refer to other occupants. For example: "the eldest son of Ch'unghyodang".

== Reused names ==
In some schools, in particular the main Utagawa school, the gō of the most senior member was adopted when the master died and the chief pupil assumed his position. Perhaps as a sign of respect, artists might take the gō of a previous artist. This makes attribution difficult. The censors' seal helps determine a particular print's date. Style also is significant. For example, Kunisada, once he changed his gō to Toyokuni, initiated the practice of signing prints with a signature in the elongated oval toshidama ('New Year's Jewel') seal of the Utagawa school, an unusual cartouche with the zig-zag in the upper right-hand corner. His successors continued this practice.

In modern scholarship on the subject, a Roman numeral identifies an artist in the sequence of artists using a gō. Thus, Kunisada I is also known as Toyokuni III, since he was the third artist to use that gō.

== See also ==
- Courtesy name
- Pen name
