= Utagawa Toyoharu =

Japanese artist (1735–1814)

Utagawa Toyoharu (歌川 豊春, c. 1735 – 1814) was a Japanese artist in the ukiyo-e genre, known as the founder of the Utagawa school and for his uki-e pictures that incorporated Western-style geometrical perspective to create a sense of depth.

Toyoharu was born in Japan in Tajima Province (in red) in 1735.

Born in Toyooka in Tajima Province, Toyoharu first studied art in Kyoto, then in Edo (modern Tokyo), where from 1768 he began to produce designs for ukiyo-e woodblock prints. He soon became known for his uki-e "floating pictures" of landscapes and famous sites, as well as copies of Western and Chinese perspective prints. Though his were not the first perspective prints in ukiyo-e, they were the first to appear as full-colour nishiki-e, and they demonstrate a much greater mastery of perspective techniques than the works of his predecessors. Toyoharu was the first to make the landscape a subject of ukiyo-e art, rather than just a background to figures and events. By the 1780s he had turned primarily to painting. The Utagawa school of art grew to dominate ukiyo-e in the 19th century with artists such as Utamaro, Hiroshige, and Kuniyoshi.

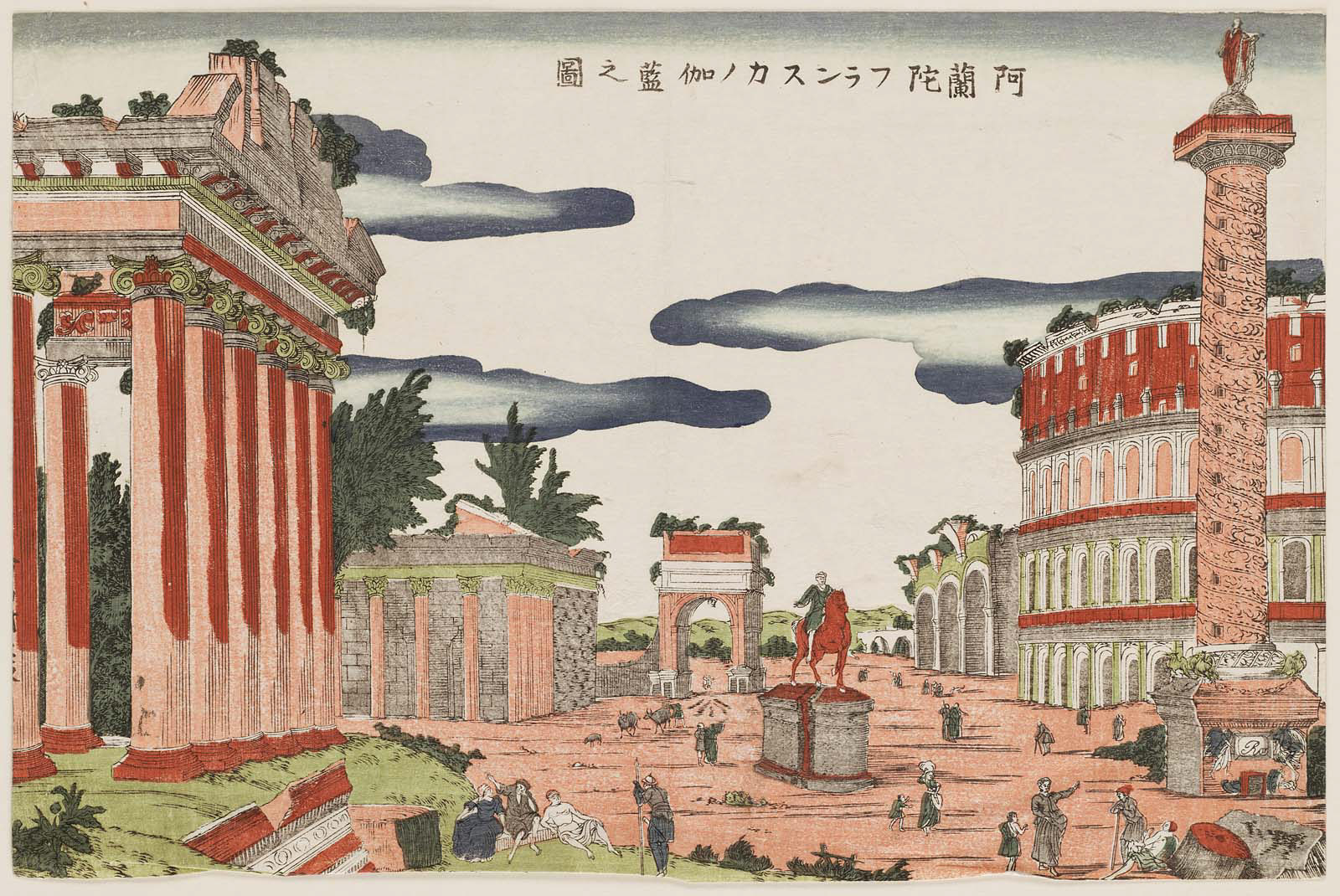
A Perspective View of French Churches in Holland, actually based on a print of the Roman Forum, c. 1770s

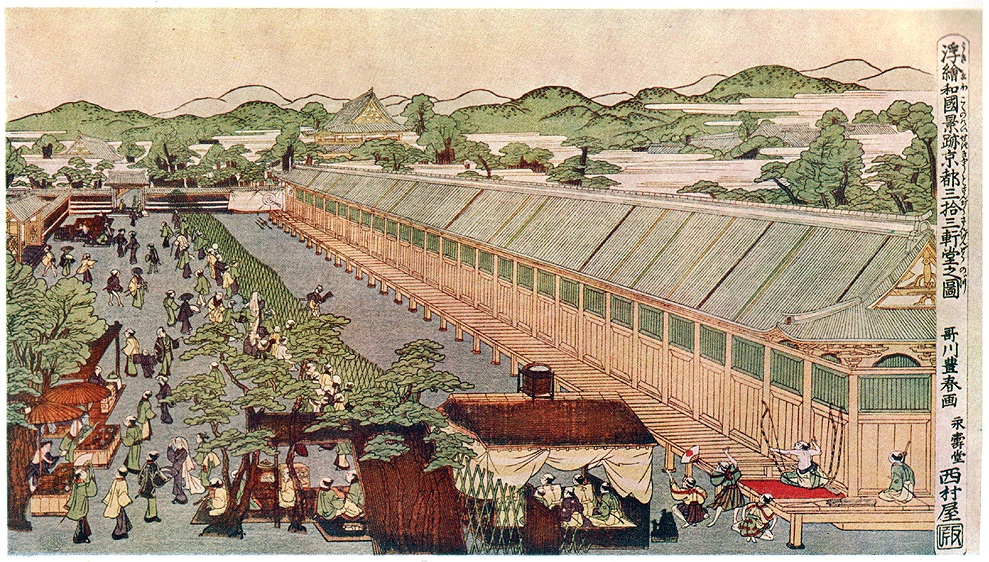
Perspective Pictures of Places in Japan: Sanjūsangen-dō in Kyoto, depicting an archery competition, c. 1772–1781

== Life and career ==
Utagawa Toyoharu was born c. 1735 (Note: Toyoharu's birthdate is calculated from an inscription in the book Saitan Kyōka Edo Murasaki (歳旦狂歌江戸紫) printed in Kansei 7 (c. 1795), in which he states he is in his sixty-first year.) in Toyooka in Tajima Province. He studied in Kyoto under Tsuruzawa Tangei of the Kanō school of painting. It may have been around 1763 that he moved to Edo (modern Tokyo), where he studied under Toriyama Sekien. The Toyo (豊) in the art name Toyoharu (豊春) is said to have come from Sekien's personal name Toyofusa (豊房). Some sources hold he also studied under Ishikawa Toyonobu and Nishimura Shigenaga. Other art names Toyoharu went under include Ichiryūsai (一竜斎 ), Senryūsai (潜竜斎), and Shōjirō (松爾楼). Tradition holds that the name Utagawa derives from Udagawa-chō, where Toyoharu lived in the Shiba district in Edo. His common name was Tajimaya Shōjirō (但馬屋 庄次郎), and he also used the personal names Masaki (昌樹) and Shin'emon (新右衛門).

Toyoharu's work began to appear about 1768. His earliest work includes woodblock prints in a refined, delicate style of beauties and actors. Soon he began to produce uki-e "floating picture" perspective prints, a genre in which Toyoharu applied Western-style one-point perspective to create a realistic sense of depth. Most were of famous sites, including theatres, temples, and teahouses. Toyoharu's were not the first uki-e—Okumura Masanobu had made such works since the early 1740s, and claimed the genre's origin for himself. Toyoharu's were the first uki-e in the full-colour nishiki-e genre that had developed in the 1760s. Several of his prints were based on imported prints from the West or China.

From the 1780s Toyoharu appears to have dedicated himself to painting, and also produced kabuki programs and billboards after 1785. He headed the painters involved in the restoration of Nikkō Tōshō-gū in 1796. He died in 1814 and was buried in Honkyōji Temple in Ikebukuro under the Buddhist posthumous name Utagawa-in Toyoharu Nichiyō Shinji (歌川院豊春日要居士). (Note: The temple is located at 2-41-4 Minami Ikebukuro, Toyoshima Ward, Tokyo, 35.725321°N 139.718633°E)

Western influence on Toyoharu

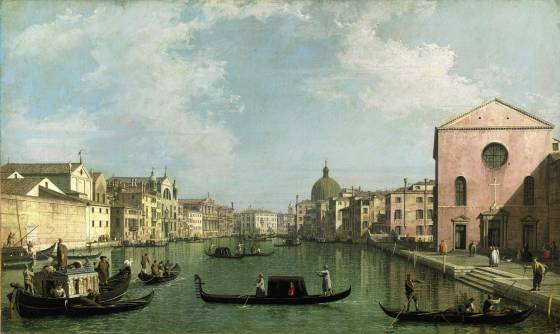
The Canal Grande from Santa Croce to the East
Canaletto, oil on canvas, 18th century

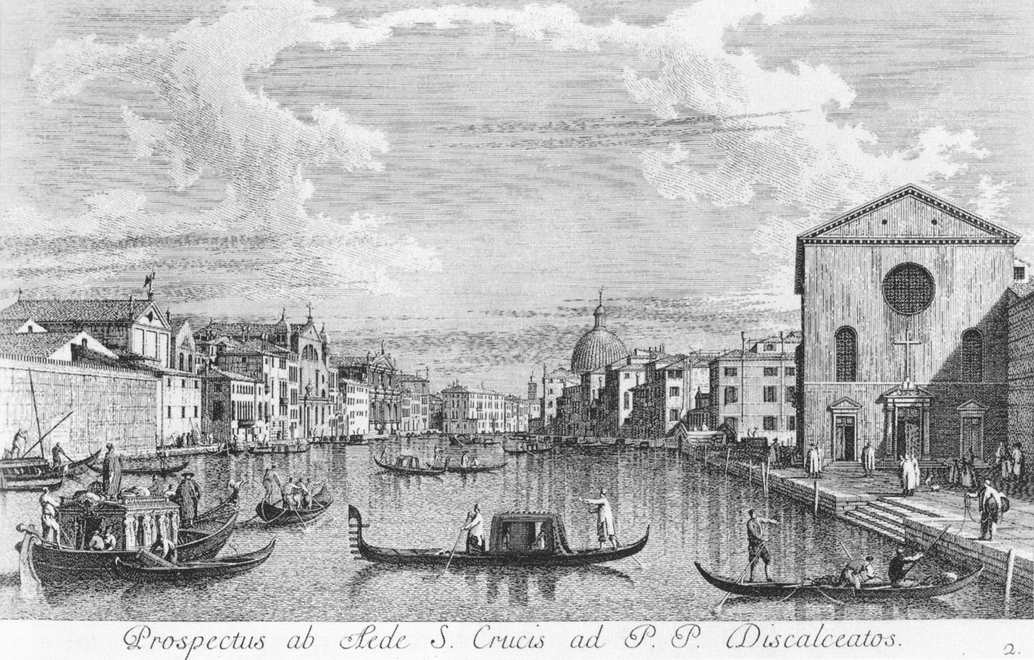
The Canal Grande from Santa Croce to the East
Antonio Visentini, copperplate engraving, 1742

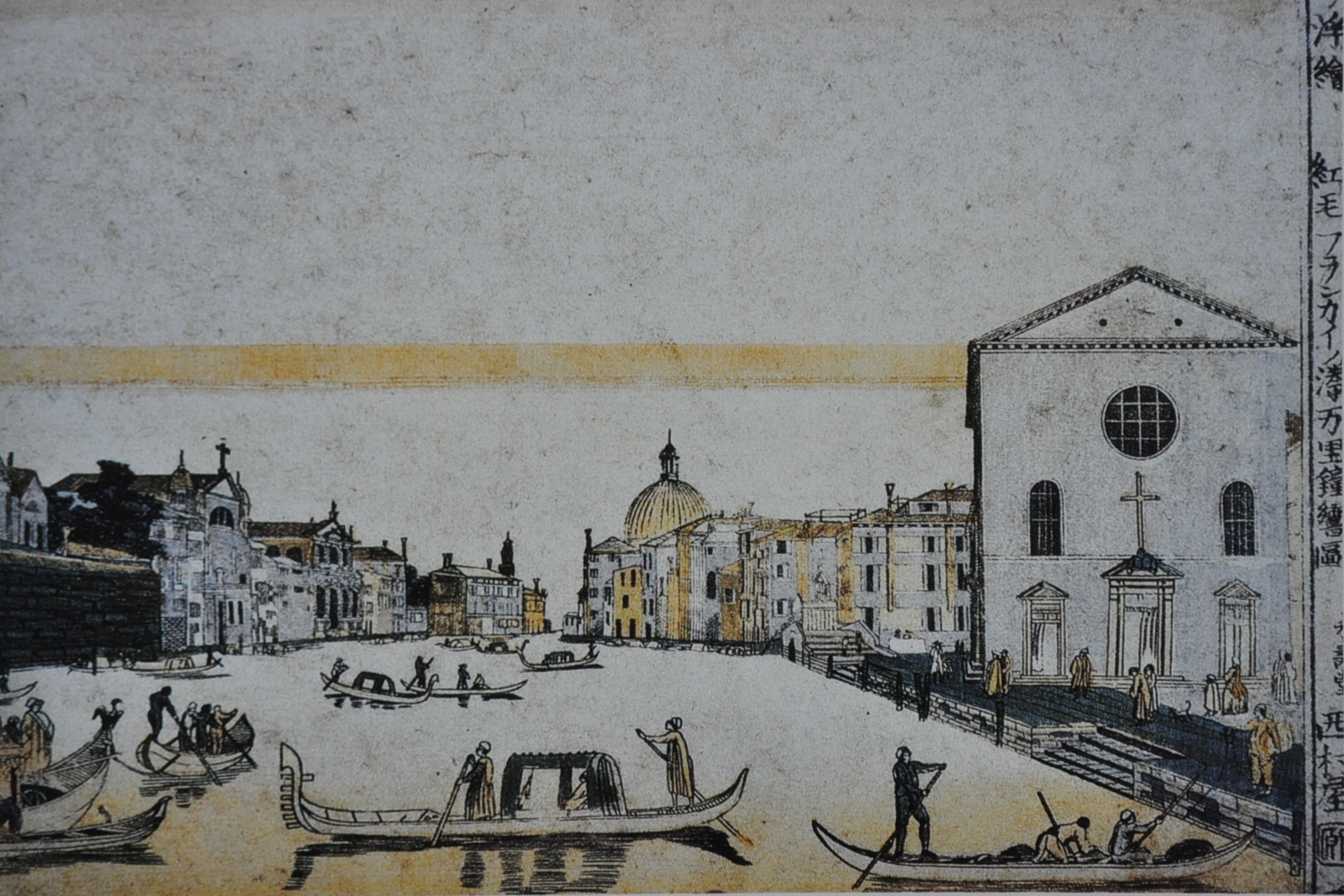
The Bell which Resounds for Ten Thousand Leagues in the Dutch Port of Frankai
Toyoharu, woodblock print, c. 1770s

== Style ==
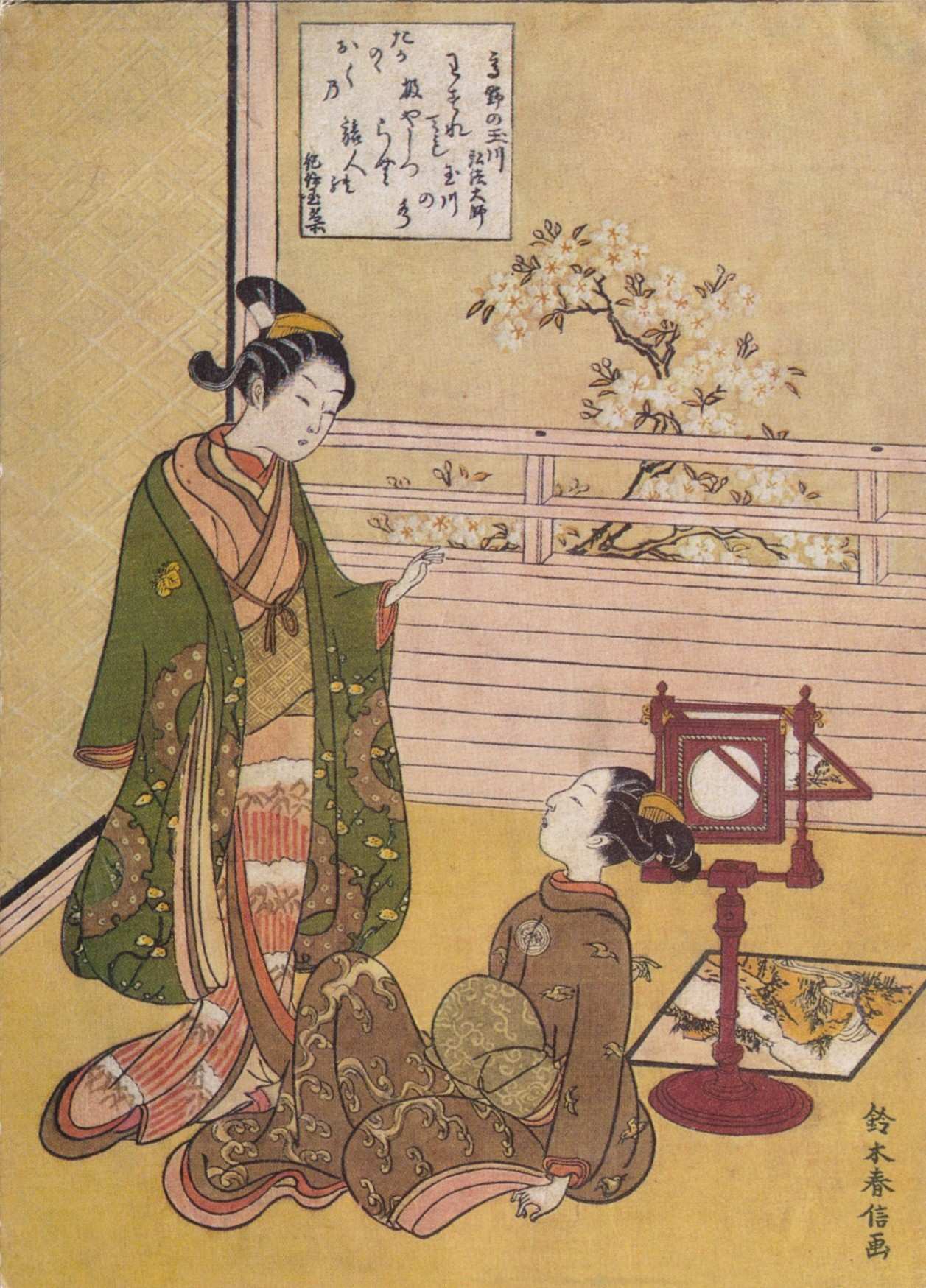
Young women using a megane-e device Harunobu, c. 1760s

Toyoharu's works have a gentle, calm, and unpretentious touch, and display the influence of ukiyo-e masters such as Ishikawa Toyonobu and Suzuki Harunobu. Harunobu pioneered the full-colour nishiki-e print and was particularly popular and influential in the 1760s, when Toyoharu first began his career.

Toyoharu produced a number of willowy, graceful bijin-ga portraits of beauties in hashira-e pillar prints. Only about fifteen examples of his bijin-ga are known, almost all from his earliest period. One of the better-known examples of Toyoharu's work in this style is a four-sheet set depicting the Chinese ideal of the four arts. Toyoharu produced a small number of yakusha-e actor prints that, in contrast to the works of the leading Katsukawa school, are executed in the learned style of an Ippitsusai Bunchō.

While Toyoharu trained in Kyoto he may have been exposed to the works of Maruyama Ōkyo, whose popular megane-e were pictures in one-point perspective meant to be viewed in a special box in the manner of the French vue d'optique. Toyoharu may also have seen the Chinese vue d'optique prints made in the 1750s that inspired Ōkyo's work.

Early in his career, Toyoharu began producing the uki-e for which he is best remembered. Books on geometrical perspective translated from Dutch and Chinese sources appeared in the 1730s, and soon after, ukiyo-e prints displaying these techniques appeared first in the works of Torii Kiyotada and then of Okumura Masanobu. These early examples were inconsistent in their application of perspective techniques, and the results can be unconvincing; Toyoharu's were much more dextrous, though not strict—he manipulated it to allow the representation of figures and objects that otherwise would have been obscured. Toyoharu's works helped pioneer the landscape as an ukiyo-e subject, rather than merely a background for human figures or events, as in Masanobu's works. Toyoharu's earliest uki-e cannot be reliably dated, but are assumed to have appeared before 1772: early in that year (Note: On the 29th day of the second month of Meiwa 9, or 1 April 1772) the Great Meiwa Fire in Edo destroyed the Niō-mon gate in Ueno, the subject of Toyoharu's Famous Views of Edo: Niō-mon in Ueno. (Note: Scholars estimate Famous Views of Edo: Niō-mon in Ueno to have appeared c. 1770–71 based on evidence from the figures in the image.)

Toyoharu also designed uki-e associated with Edo's kabuki theatre district. In the horizontal ōban print Perspective View of the Theatres in Sakai-chō and Fukiya-chō on Opening Night, the districts forming the hub of Edo's theatre quarter, especially lively on the night of the kaomise season-opening performances, Toyoharu depicted enthusiastic theatregoers crowding the avenue on their way to various theatres, food stalls and teahouses, with street vendors, porters and servants raising their wares and boxes above the heads of passers-by, while the yagura towers and e-kanban signboards above the different theatres' entrances are visible at second-floor level. The foreground is kept relatively uncluttered, with figures carefully selected and placed; besides its compositional importance, this device impresses on the viewer the great variety and intrinsic interest of the mass of heads that seem to sway in the background, while the long, exaggerated perspective view is characteristic of the type, combining an exotic style with carefully assimilated native subject matter in what is considered among Toyoharu's finest work.

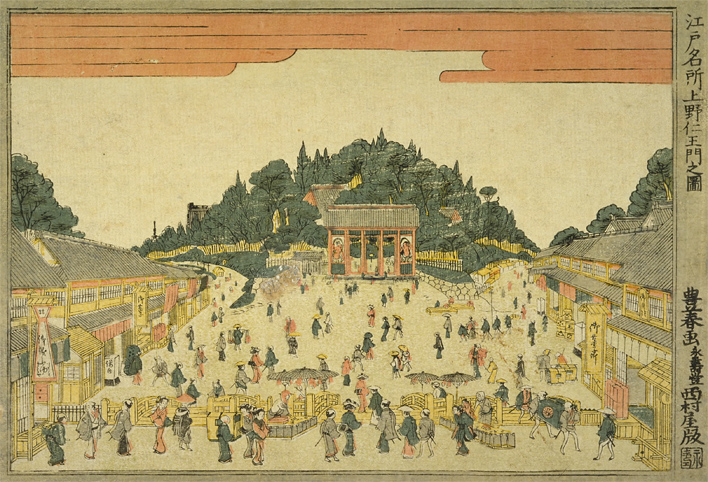
Famous Views of Edo: Niō-mon in Ueno, c. 1770–71

Several of Toyoharu's prints were imitations of imported prints of famed European locations, some of which were Western and others Chinese imitations of Western prints. The titles were often fictional: The Bell which Resounds for Ten Thousand Leagues in the Dutch Port of Frankai is an imitation of a print of the Grand Canal of Venice from 1742 by Antonio Visentini, itself based on a painting by Canaletto. Toyoharu titled another A Perspective View of French Churches in Holland, though he based it on a print of the Roman Forum. Toyoharu took licence with other details of foreign lands, such as having the Dutch swim in their canals. Japanese and Chinese mythology were also frequent subjects in Toyoharu's uki-e prints, the foreign perspective technique giving such prints an exotic feel.

In his nikuhitsu-ga paintings the influence of Toyonobu can seem strong, but in his seals on these paintings Toyoharu proclaims himself a pupil of Sekien. (Note: One such seal reads "Student of Toriyama Sekien Toyofusa" (鳥山石燕豊房門人, Toriyama Sekien Toyofusa Monjin).) His efforts contributed to the development of the Rinpa school. His paintings have joined the collections of foreign museums such as the British Museum, Museum of Fine Arts, Boston, and the Freer Gallery of Art. His paintings include byōbu folding screens—a genre in which ukiyo-e is said to have its origins, but was rare in ukiyo-e after the development of nishiki-e prints. A six-panel example of a spring scene in Yoshiwara (Note: 新吉原春景図屏風 Shin Yoshiwara Harukage-zu Byōbu, "New scenes in the springtime Yoshiwara pleasure district") resides in France in a private collection.

The Four Arts by Toyoharu

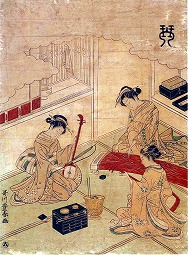
Shamisen

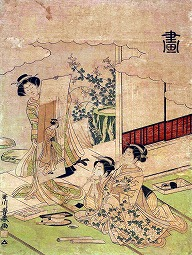
Painting

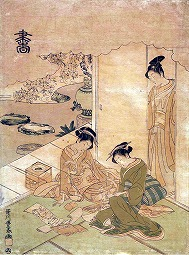
Calligraphy

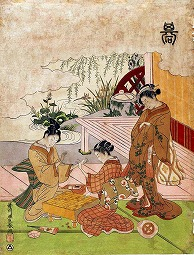
Playing Go
Perspective prints by Toyoharu

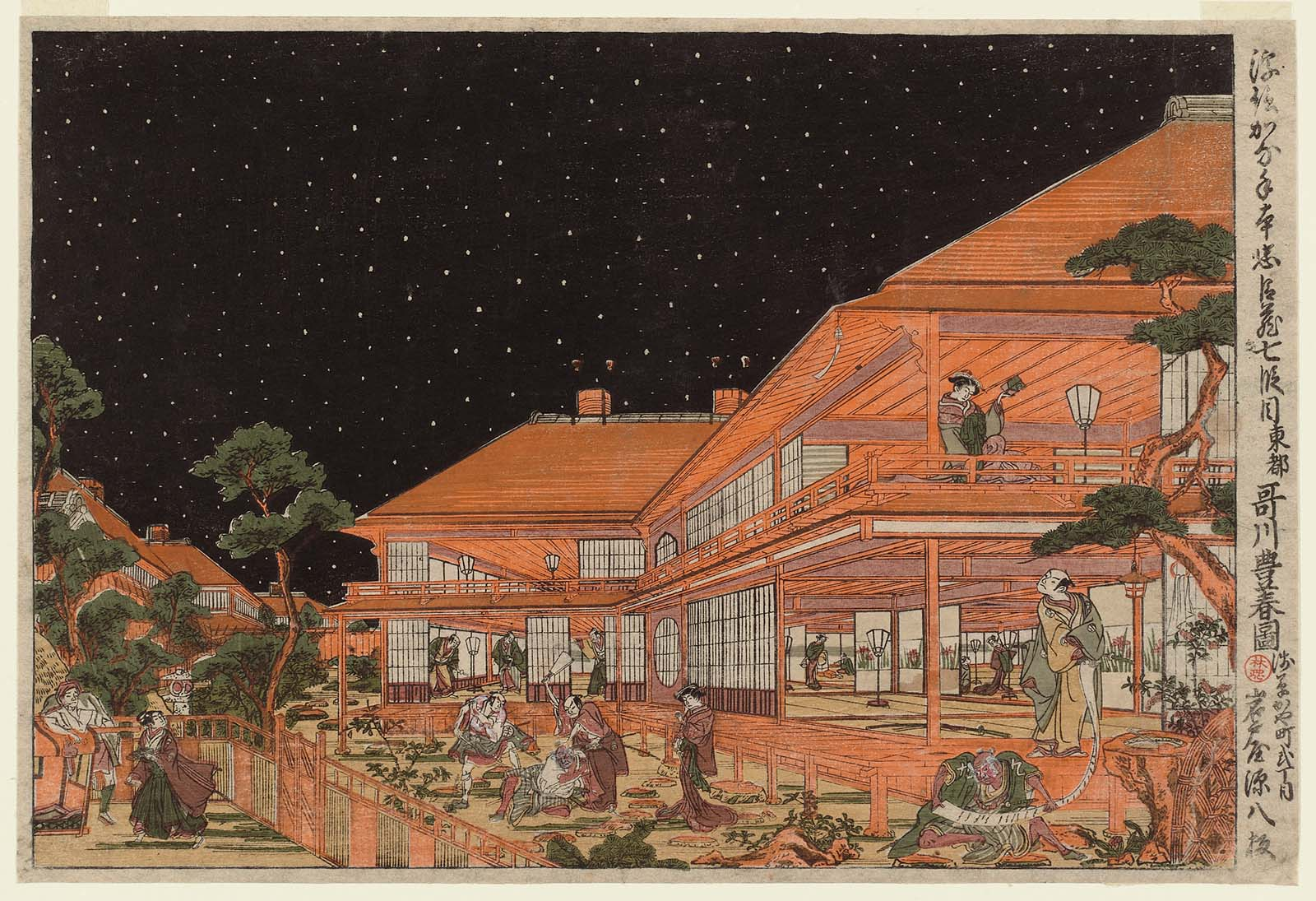
From the seventh act of the Kanadehon Chūshingura, c. 1770s

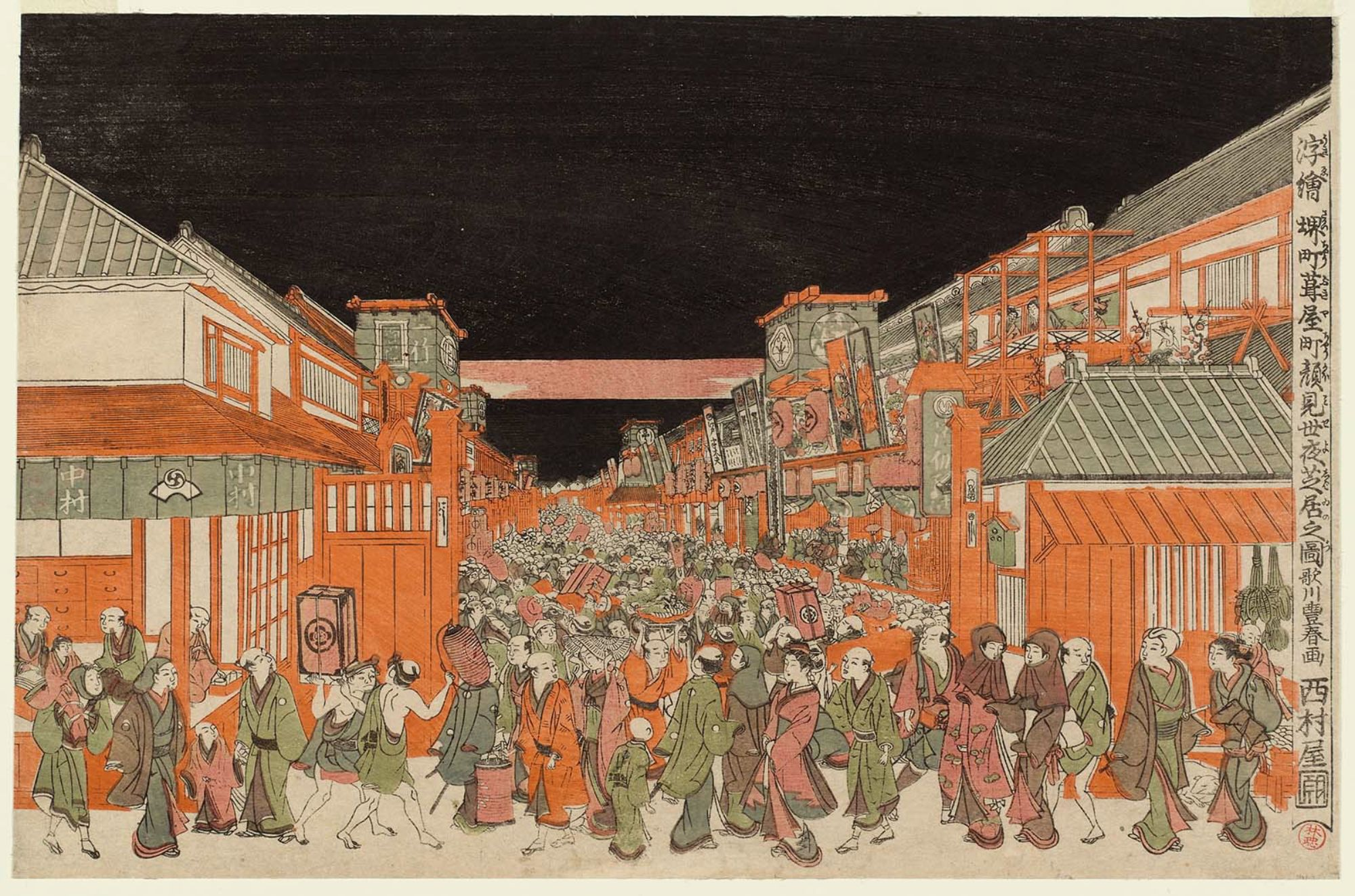
Perspective View of the Theatres in Sakai-chō and Fukiya-chō on Opening Night, c. 1770s

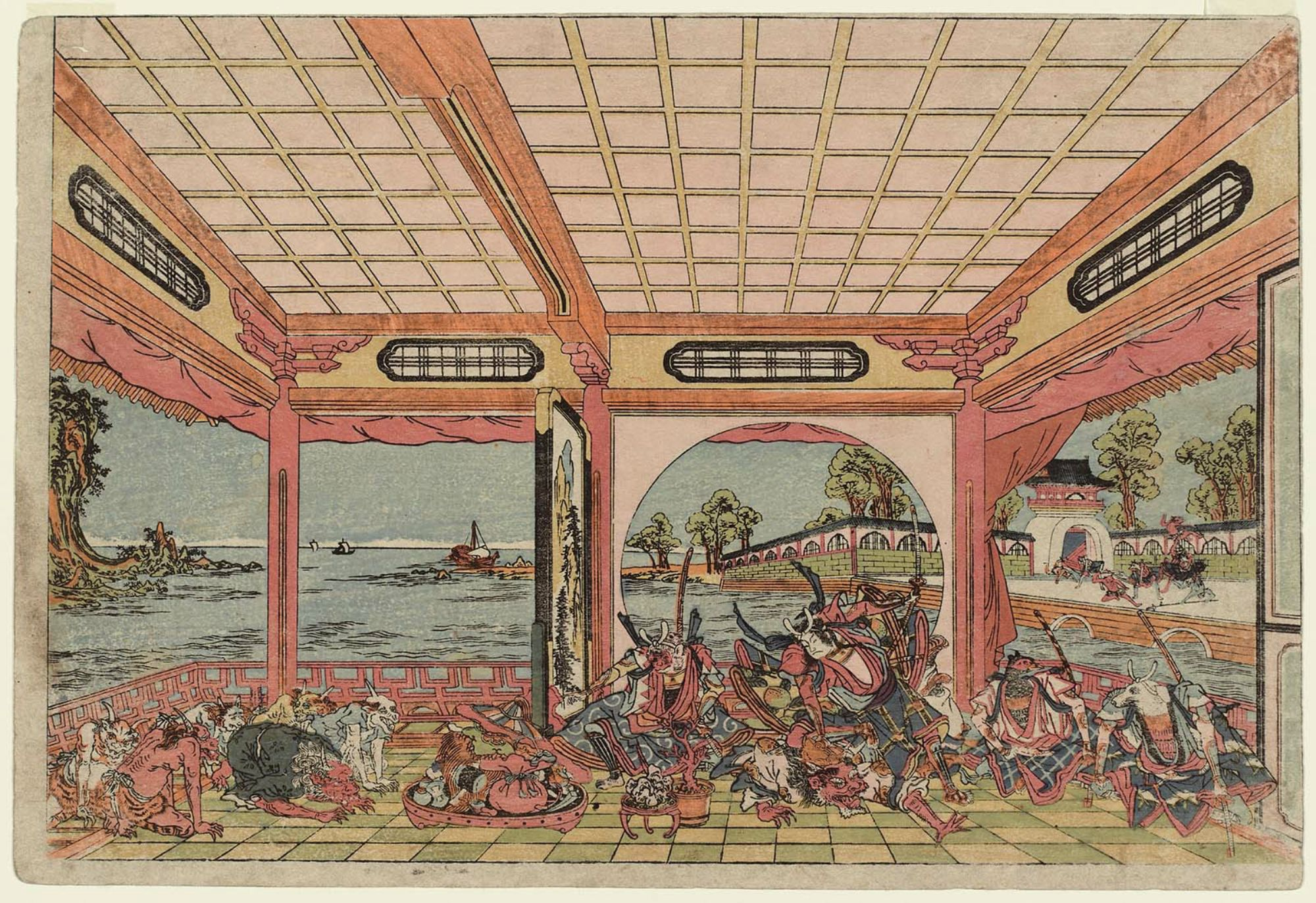
Momotarō and his Animal Friends Conquer the Demons, c. 1770s

== Legacy ==
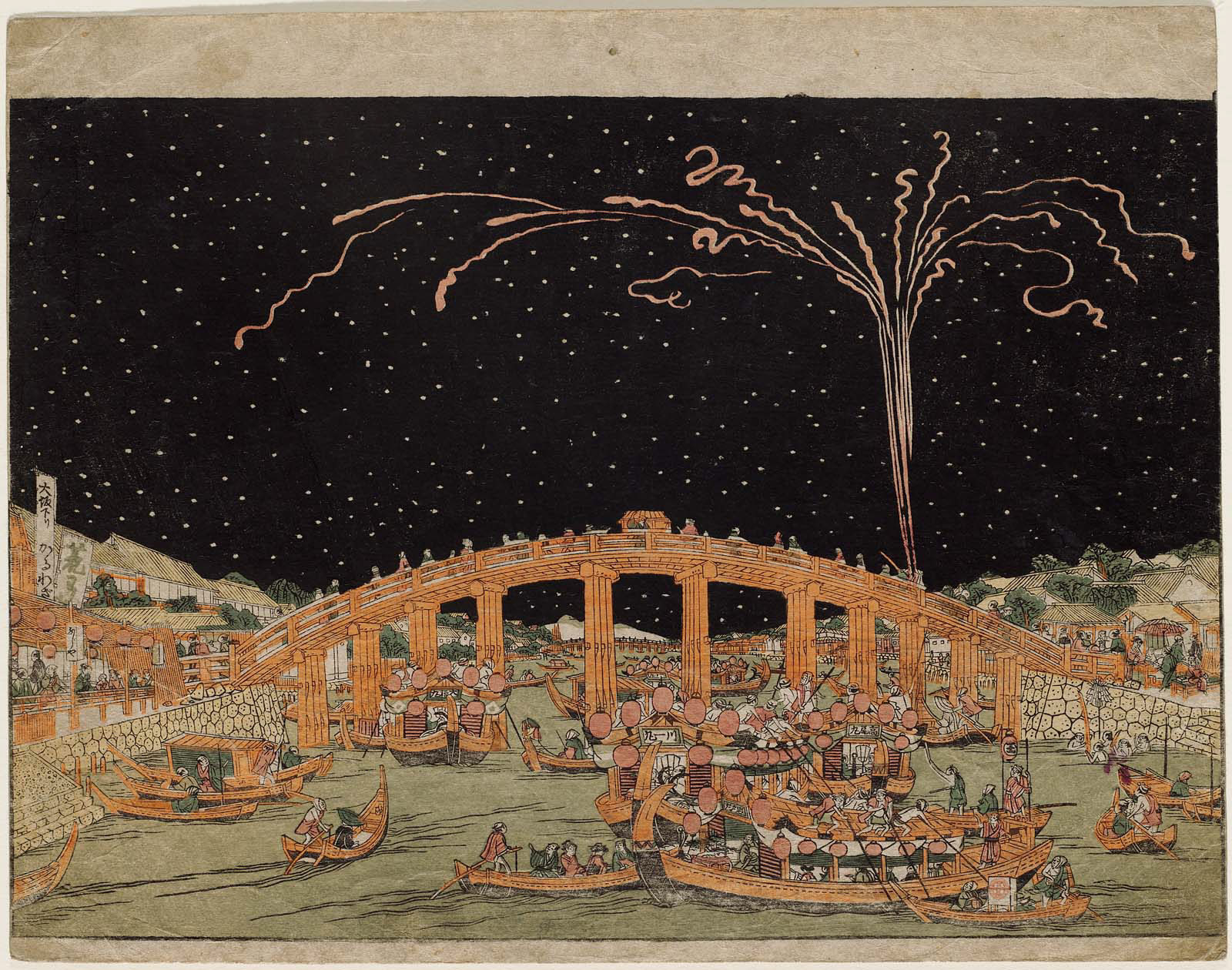
Fireworks at Ryōgoku Bridge

The popularity of Toyoharu's work peaked in the 1770s. By the 19th century, Western-style perspective techniques had ceased to be a novelty and had been absorbed into Japanese artistic culture, deployed by such artists as Hokusai and Hiroshige, two artists best remembered for their landscapes, a genre Toyoharu pioneered.

The Utagawa school that Toyoharu founded was to become one of the most influential, and produced works in a far greater variety of genres than any other school. His students included Toyokuni and Toyohiro; Toyohiro worked in the style of his master, while Toyokuni, who headed the school from 1814, became a prominent and prolific producer of yakusha-e prints of kabuki actors. Other well-known members of the school were Utamaro, Hiroshige, Kuniyoshi, and Kunisada. Though Japanese art schools, such as the Katsukawa in ukiyo-e and the Kanō in painting, emphasized a uniformity of style, a general style in the Utagawa school is not easy to recognize aside from a concern with realism and facial expressiveness. The school dominated ukiyo-e production by the mid-19th century, and most of the artists—such as Kobayashi Kiyochika—who documented the modernization of Japan during the Meiji period during ukiyo-e's declining years belonged to the Utagawa school.

The Torii school lasted longer, but the Utagawa school had more adherents. It fostered closer master–student relations and more systematized training than in other schools. Excepting a few prominent examples, such as Hiroshige or Kuniyoshi, the later generations of artists tended to lack stylistic diversity, and their work has become emblematic of ukiyo-e's decline in the 19th century.

Toyoharu also taught painting. His most prominent student was Sakai Hōitsu.

As of 2014, studies into Toyoharu's work have not been carried out in depth. Cataloguing and analyzing his work and his and his publishers' seals was still in its infancy. However, his work is kept in a variety of museums, including the Carnegie Museum of Art, National Museum of Asian Art, the Maidstone Museum, the Worcester Art Museum, the Fine Arts Museum of San Francisco, the Minneapolis Institute of Art, the Portland Art Museum, the Museum of Fine Arts, Boston, the Metropolitan Museum of Art, the University of Michigan Museum of Art, the Princeton University Art Museum, and the Asian Art Museum in San Francisco.

Members of the Utagawa school

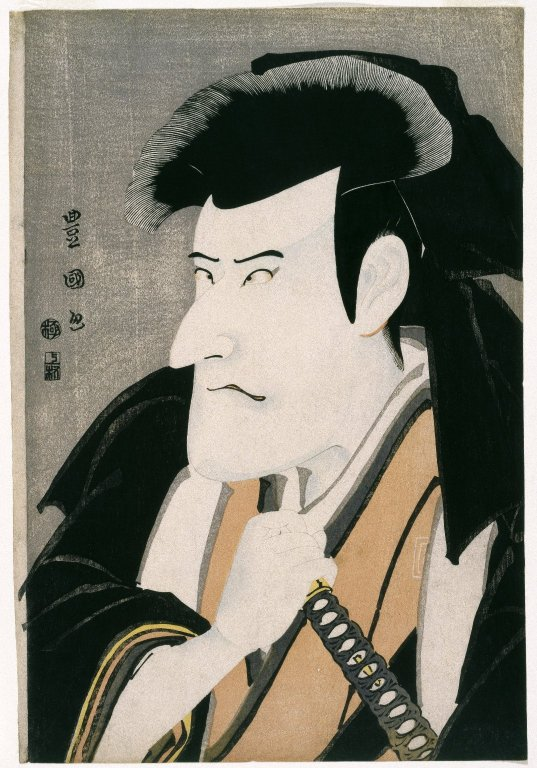
Ichikawa Komazo II, Toyokuni, c. 1797

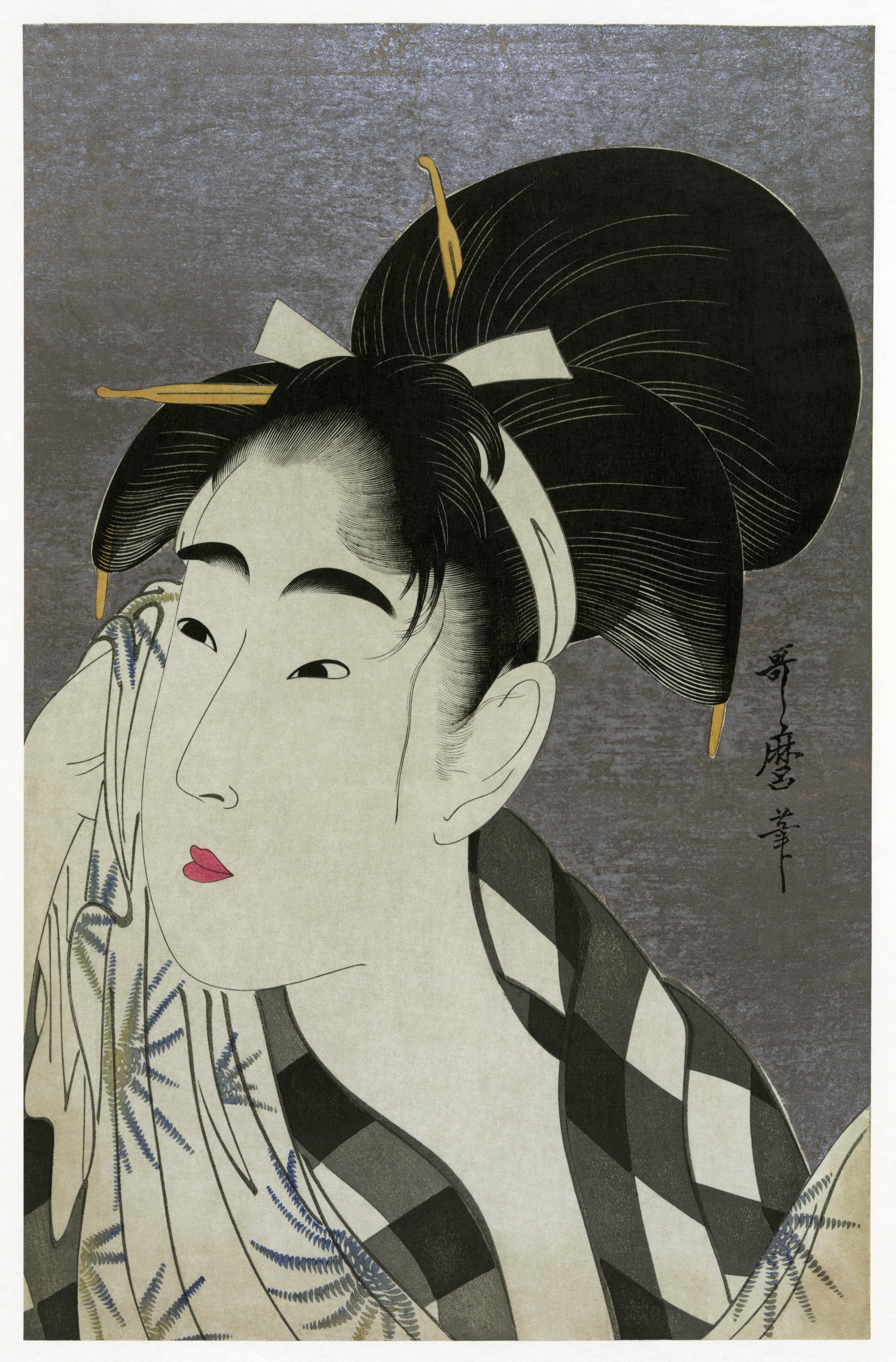
Woman Wiping Sweat, Utamaro, c. 1790s

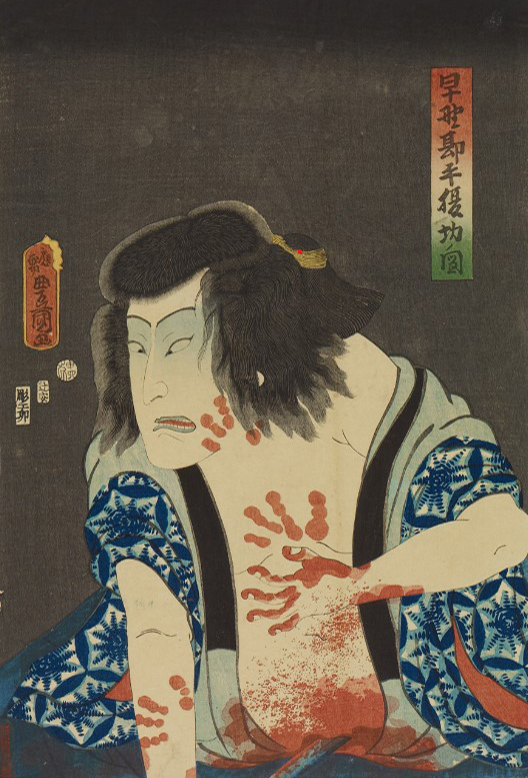
Portrait of Nakamura Fukusuke I as Hayano Kanpei, Kunisada, 1860

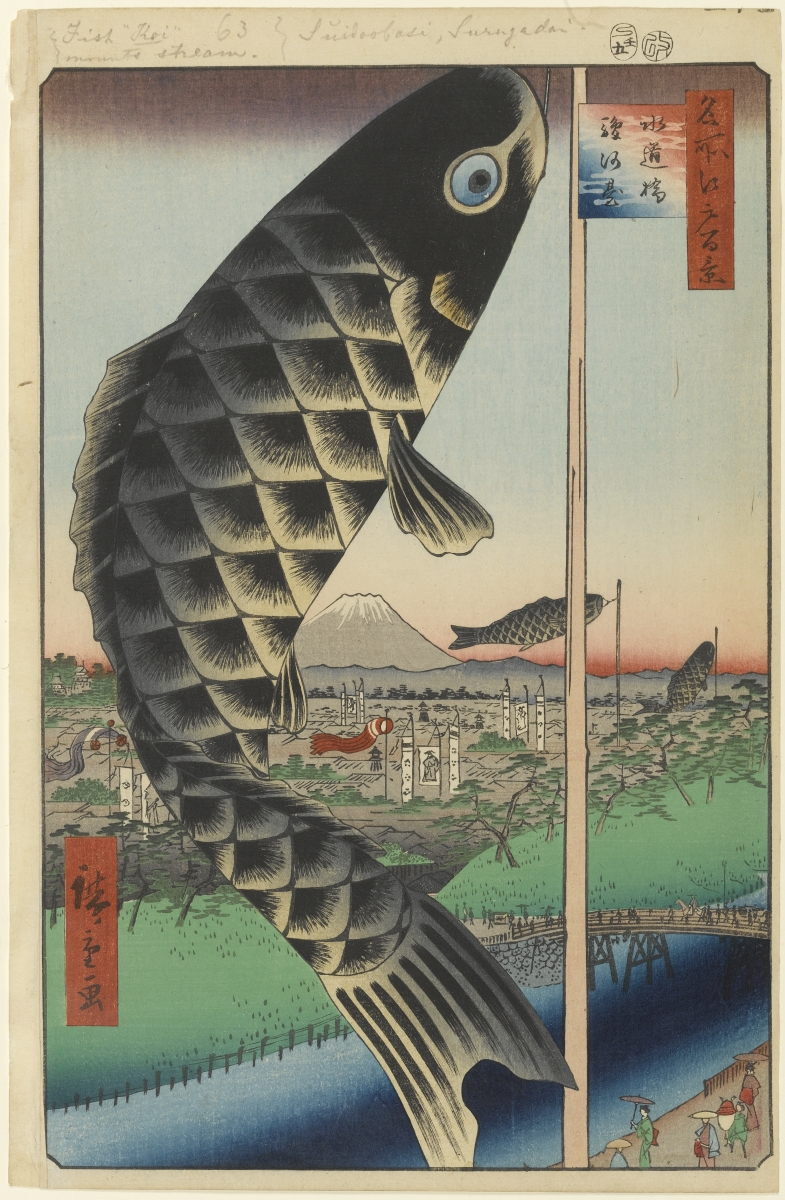
One Hundred Famous Views of Edo: Suidō Bridge and the Surugadai Quarter, Hiroshige, 1857

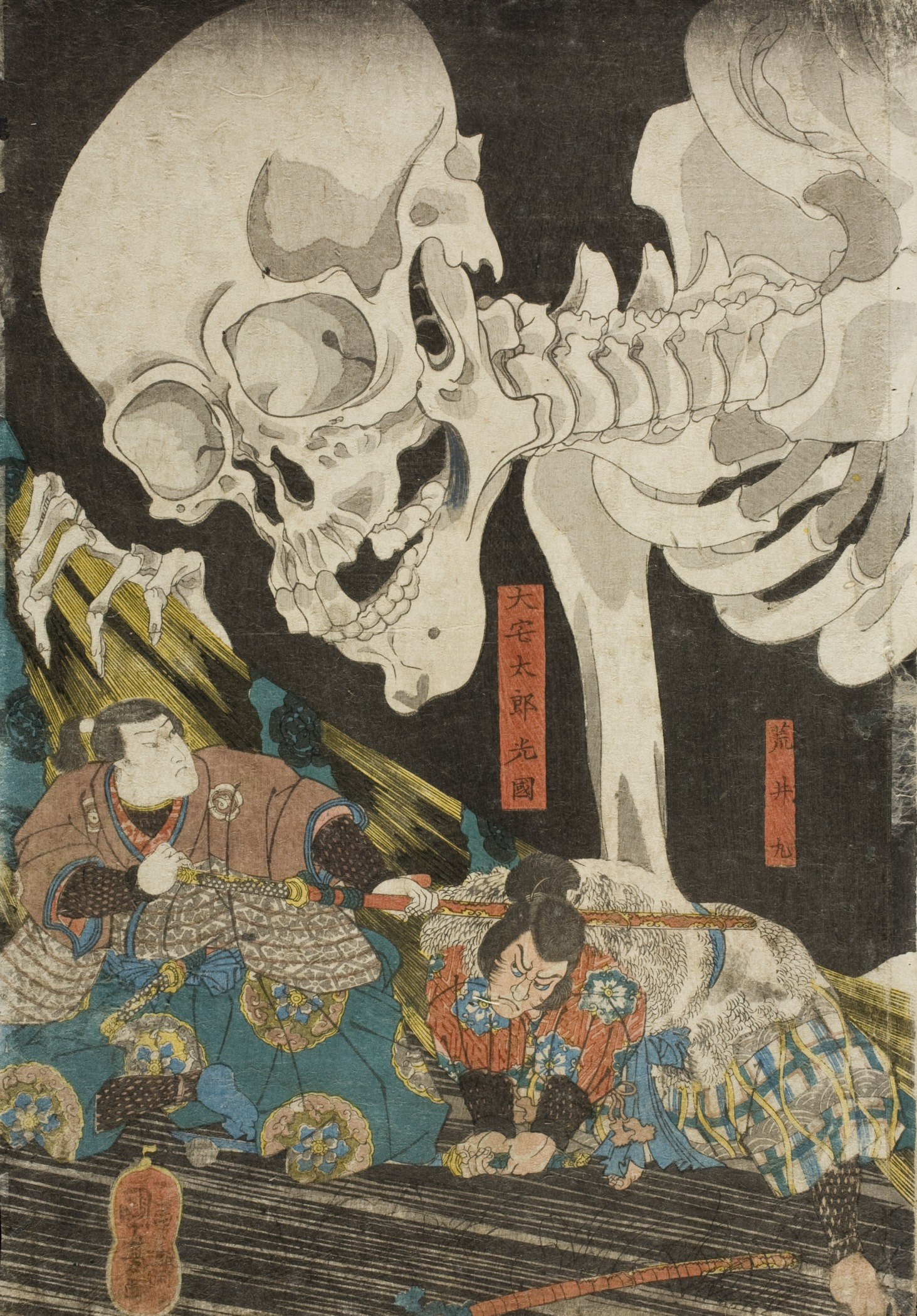
Mitsukuni and the Skeleton Specter (one of a triptych), Kuniyoshi, c. 1840s
Paintings by Toyoharu and his followers

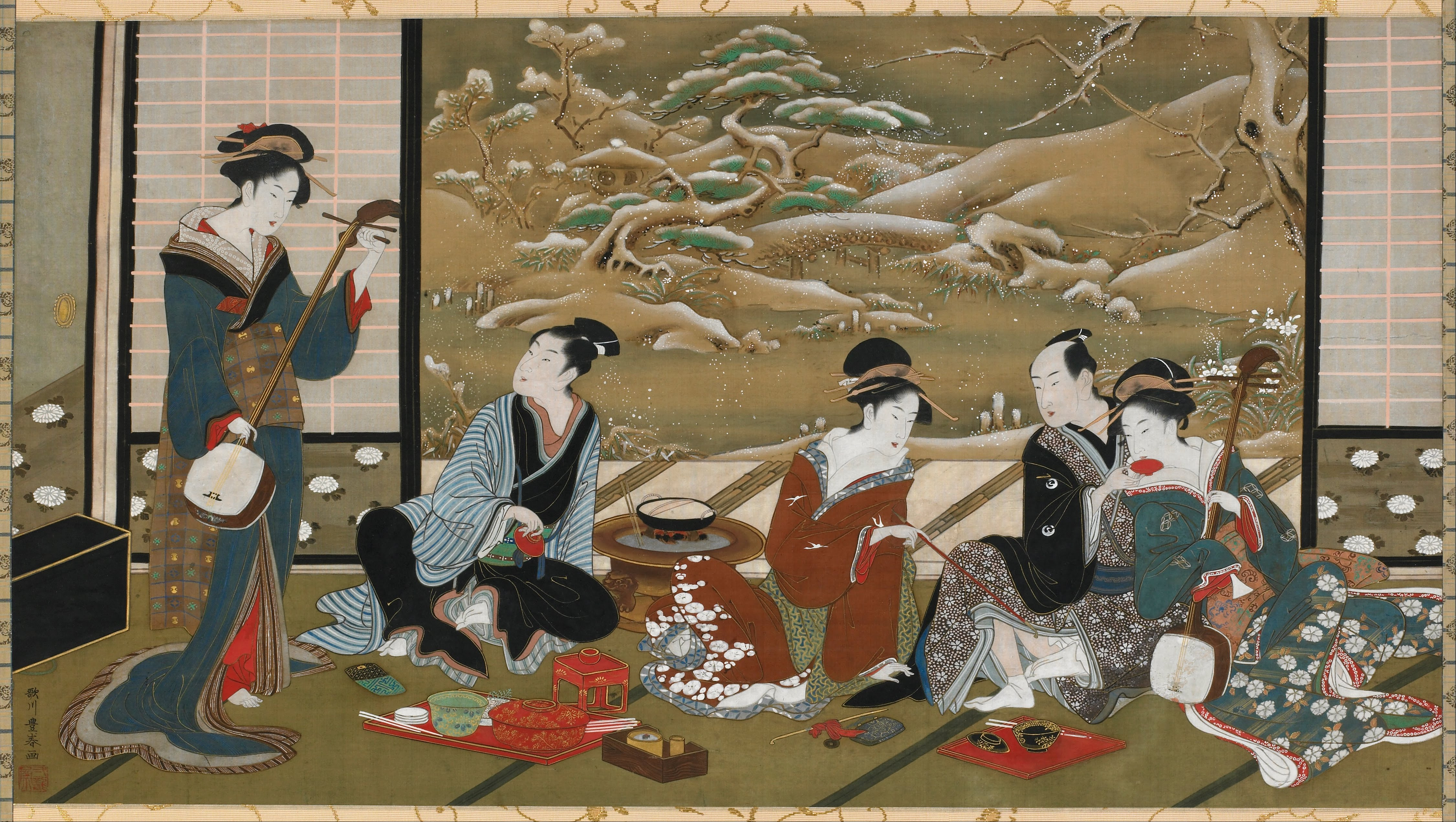
A Winter Party, colour on silk, Toyoharu, c. late 18th – early 19th century

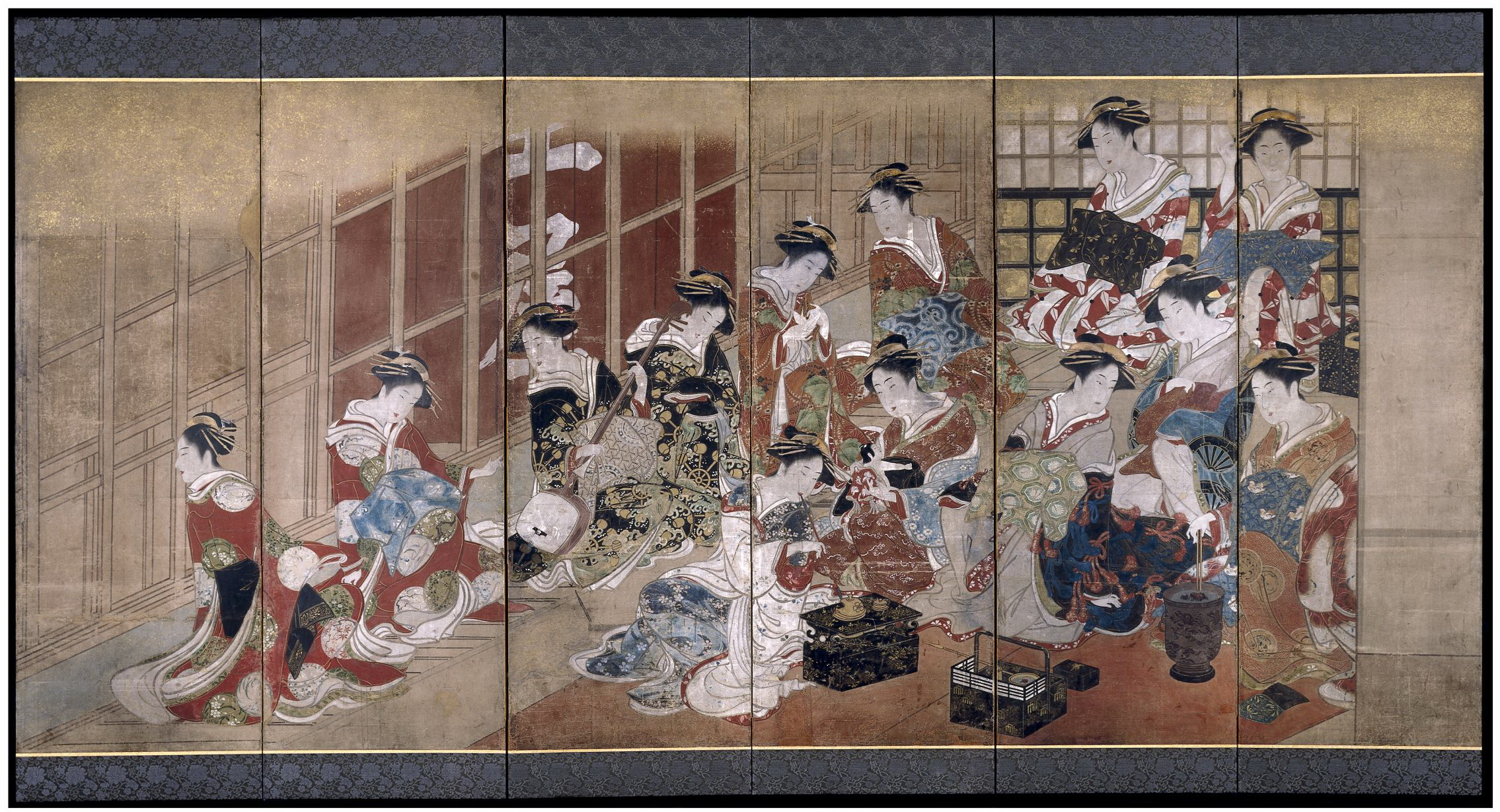
Courtesans of the Tamaya House
Toyoharu, byōbu screen painting, c. 1770s–80s

Summer and Autumn Grasses
Sakai Hōitsu, byōbu screen painting, 19th century

== See also ==
- List of Utagawa school members
