= Toyohiro =

Japanese artist

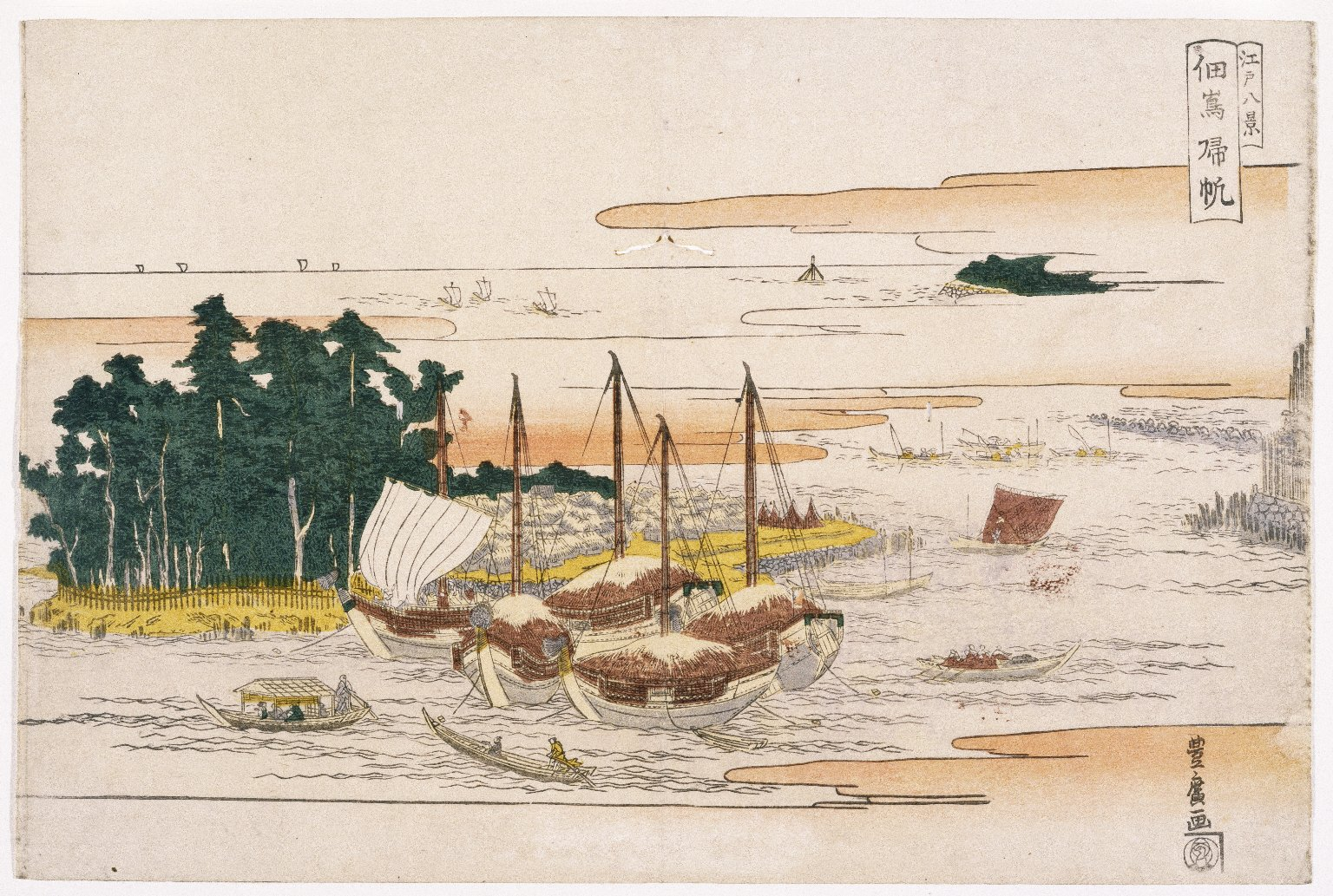
Returning Sails at Tsukuda from one of the Eight Views of Edo series by Toyohiro

Utagawa Toyohiro (歌川豊広, 歌川豐廣), birth name Okajima Tōjiro (1773–1828), was a Japanese ukiyo-e artist and painter. He was a member of the Utagawa school and studied under Utagawa Toyoharu, the school's founder. His works include a number of ukiyo-e landscape series, as well as many depictions of the daily activities in the Yoshiwara entertainment quarter; many of his stylistic features led to Hokusai and Hiroshige (the latter a prodigy who studied under Toyohiro, becoming one of the very finest of all landscape artists), as well as producing an important series of ukiyo-e triptychs in collaboration with Toyokuni, and numerous book and e-hon illustrations, which occupied him in his later years.

The ukiyo-e series he produced include the following:

- Eight Views of Edo (several series)
- Eight Views of Ōmi (several series)
- Newly Published Perspective Pieces (Shinpan uki-e)
- Twelve Months by Two Artists, Toyokuni and Toyohiro (Toyokuni Toyohiro ryōga jūnikō), with Toyokuni
- Untitled series of A Day in the Life of a Geisha
- Untitled series of Eight Views of Edo in the Snow
- The Six Great Poets
- The Twelve Hours
- The Four Accomplishments
- The Three Cities

== Life and career ==
Toyohiro entered the studio of Utagawa Toyoharu in 1782, together with his contemporary Toyokuni; Toyoharu gave him the name Toyohiro and allowed him to also use the gō Ichiryūsai.

Toyohiro is regarded as a highly talented artist who never fully realised his potential: although Toyokuni's equal in talent, he chose to leave the flashier, more popular side of ukiyo-e to his fellow pupil, dedicating himself instead to a quieter and less hurried vision of life and beauty. His surviving output is consequently relatively rare. Having studied both ukiyo-e and Kanō-school painting, he worked mainly in the hosoban and surimono formats, producing his first surimono in 1788 and his first book illustrations, in kyōkabon, in 1793. It was during this period that Toyohiro became more active and well known for bijinga genre paintings in the Kansei era (1789-1801), working in a style that approached that of Utamaro and Eishi; his figures of beautiful women were notably taller than Toyokuni's, revealing an affinity with Eishi in their understated grace.

From 1802 to 1806 Toyohiro illustrated numerous kibyōshi, and later turned to illustrating gōkan and yomihon, producing more than one hundred and fifty books in total in collaboration with authors including Takizawa Bakin, Santō Kyōden and Jippensha Ikku. His landscape (fūkeiga) print series paved the way stylistically for Hokusai and Hiroshige, and he also produced an important series of triptychs in collaboration with Toyokuni. Toyohiro died in 1828; an elegant and graceful artist, he is best remembered as the teacher of Hiroshige, whose art would have been entirely different without his patient and understated guidance.

== Gallery ==
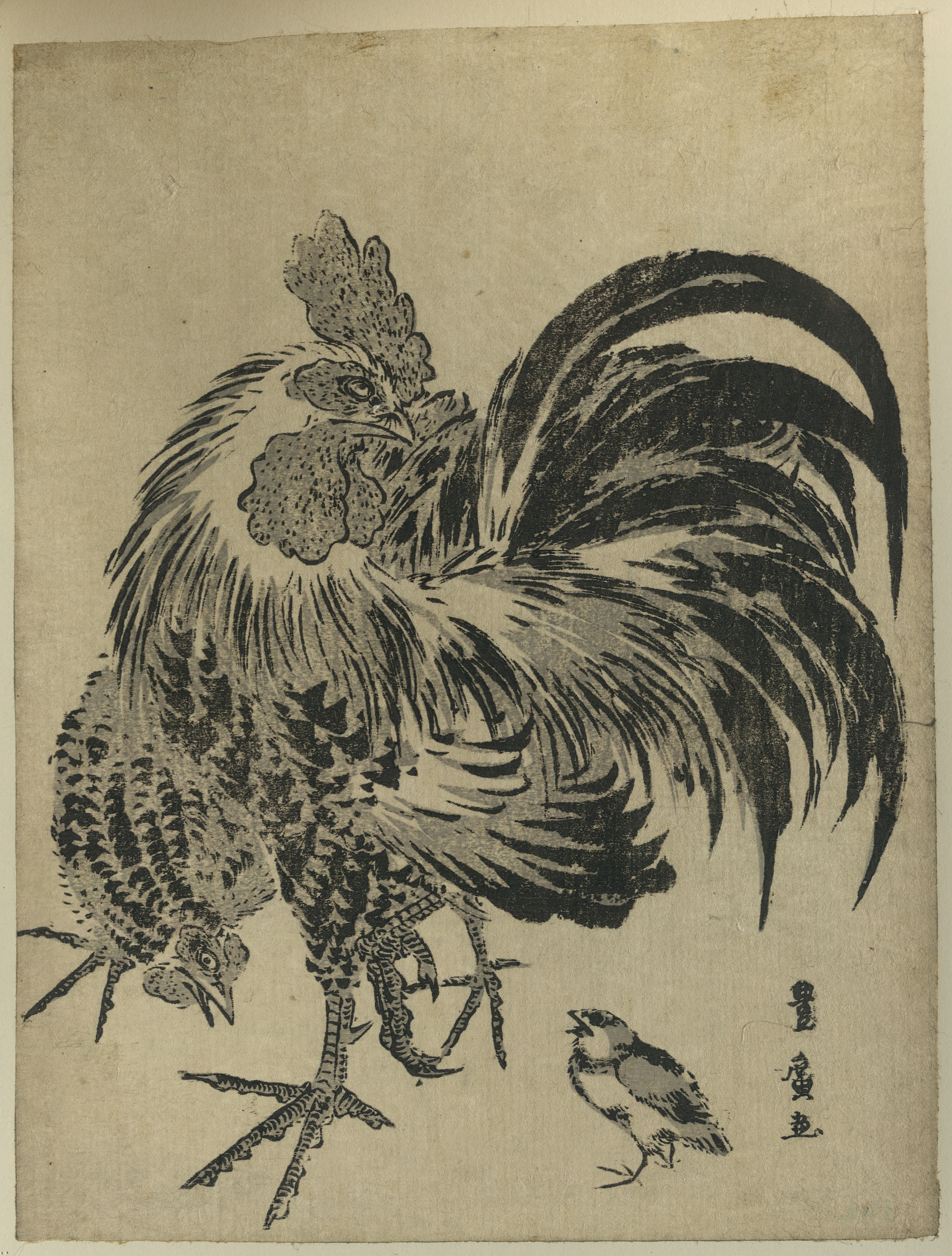
Cock, 1804

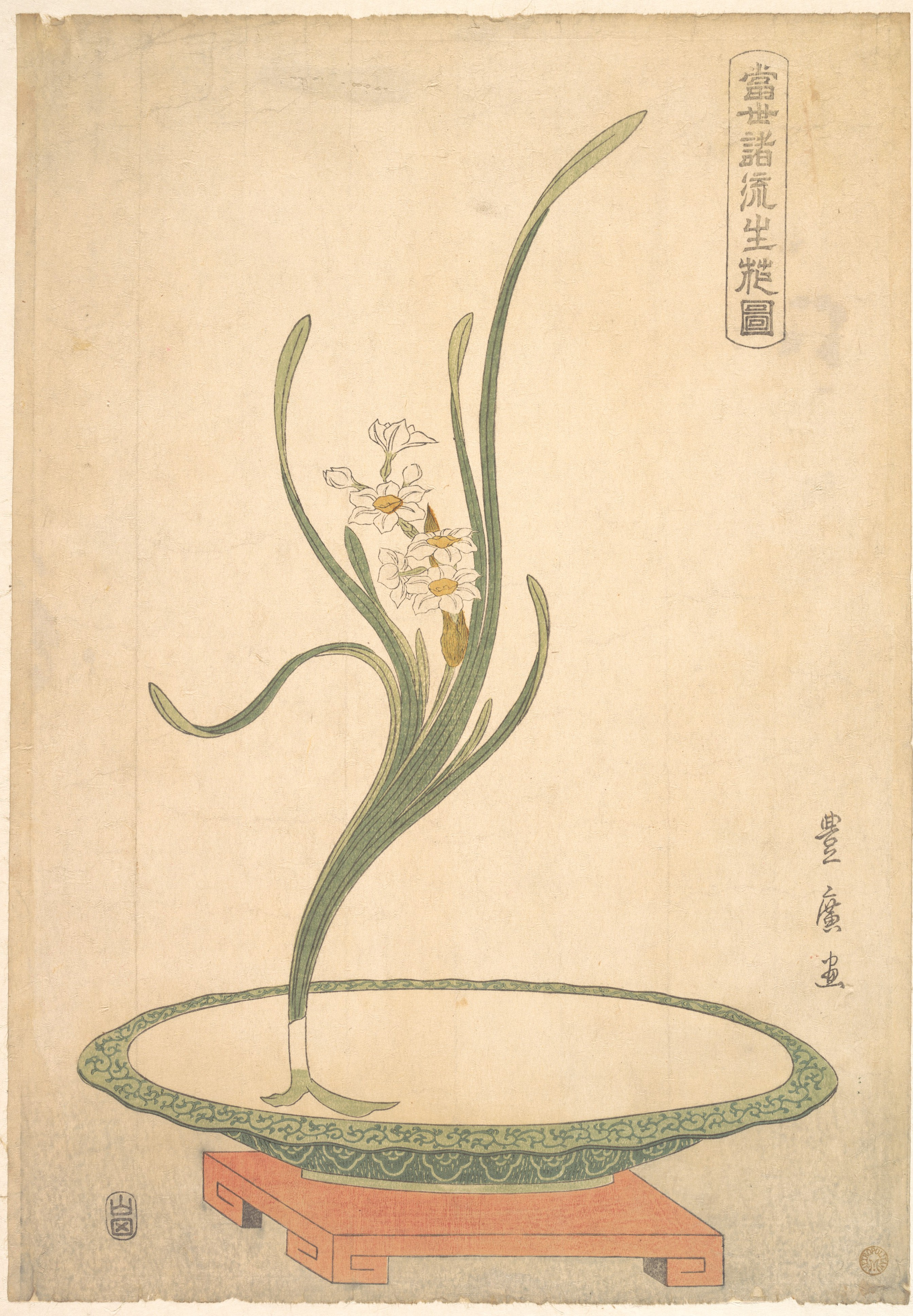
Flower Arrangement of Narcissus in a Flat Green Dish

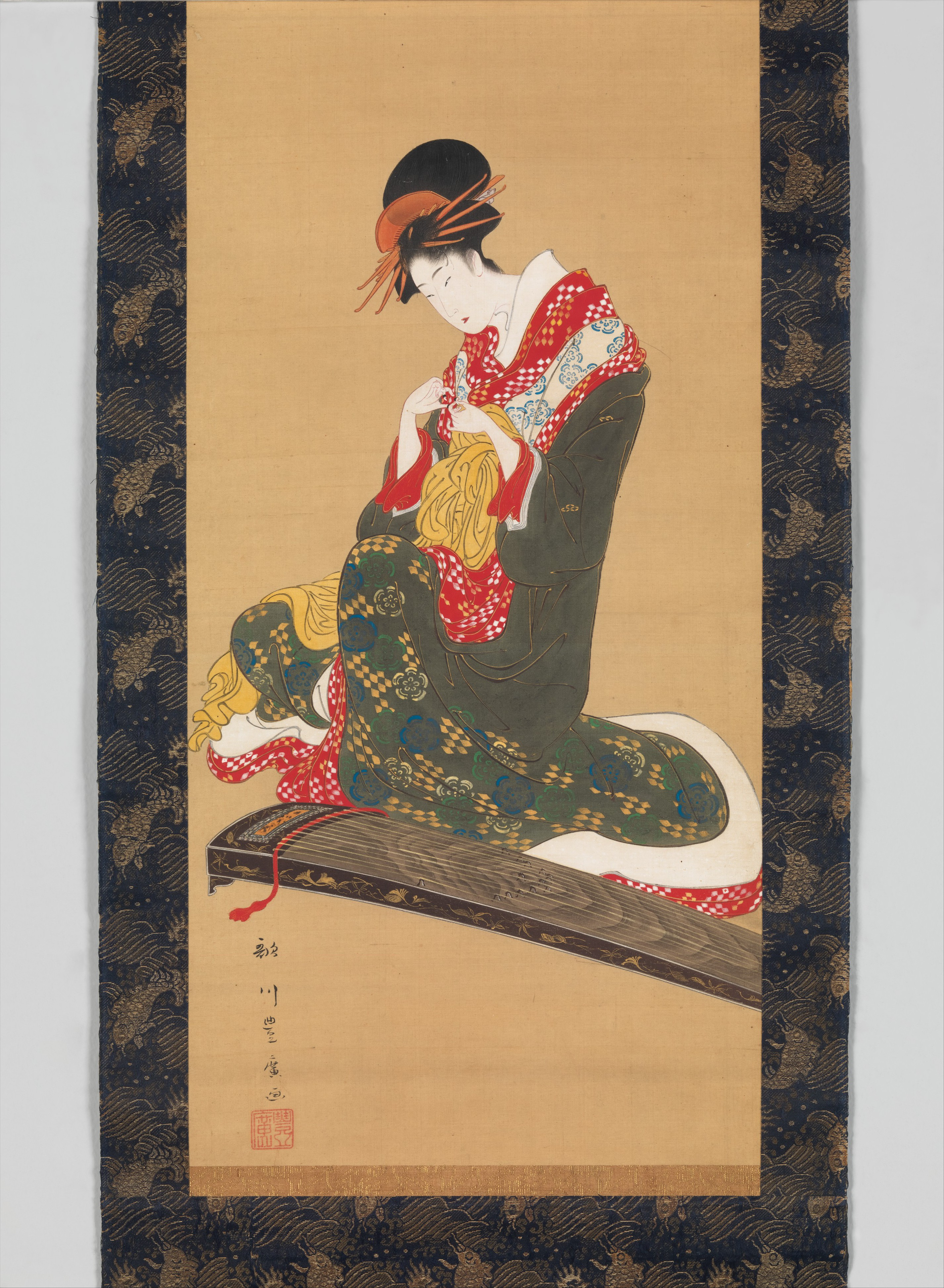
Woman Putting on Finger Plectrums to Play the Koto, hanging scroll (detail)

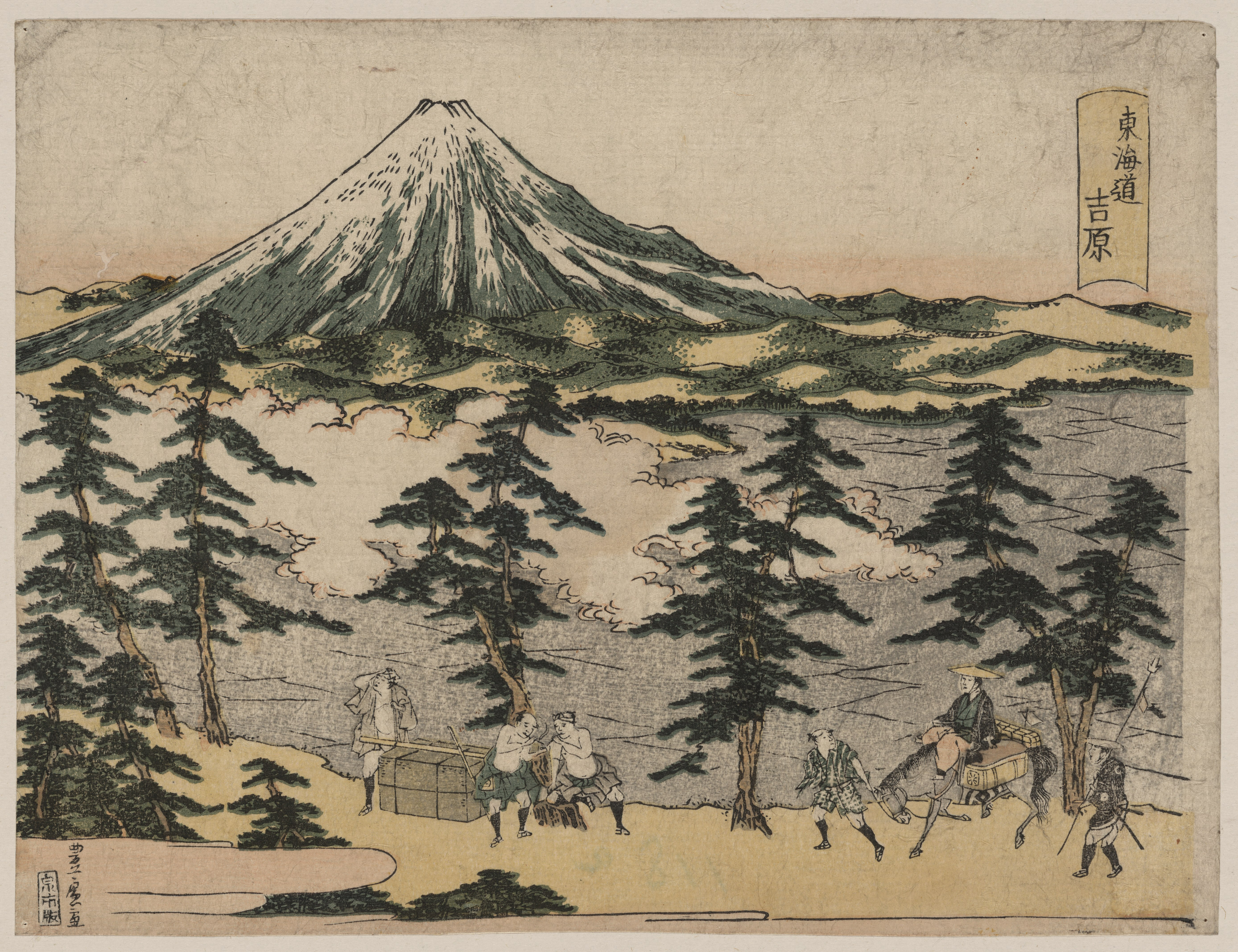
Print of Mt. Fuji, 1800
