= Vue d'optique =

Genre of etching

Vue d'optique (French), vue perspective or perspective view refers to a genre of etching popular during the second half of the 18th century and into the 19th. Vues d'optique were specifically developed to provide the illusion of depth when viewed through a zograscope, also known as an "optical diagonal machine" or viewers with similar functions.

== Characteristics ==
- Reversed type in some or all of the text, for viewing through a mirrored apparatus
- Bright hand-coloring
- Scenes chosen for their strong linear perspective (for example, diagonal lines converging at a horizon)
- Subject matter appealing to armchair travelers: shipping, cities, palaces, gardens, architecture.

== History ==
Optical viewers were generally popular with well-to-do European families in the late 18th and early 19th centuries. Perspective views were produced in London, Paris, Augsburg and several other cities.

== Gallery ==
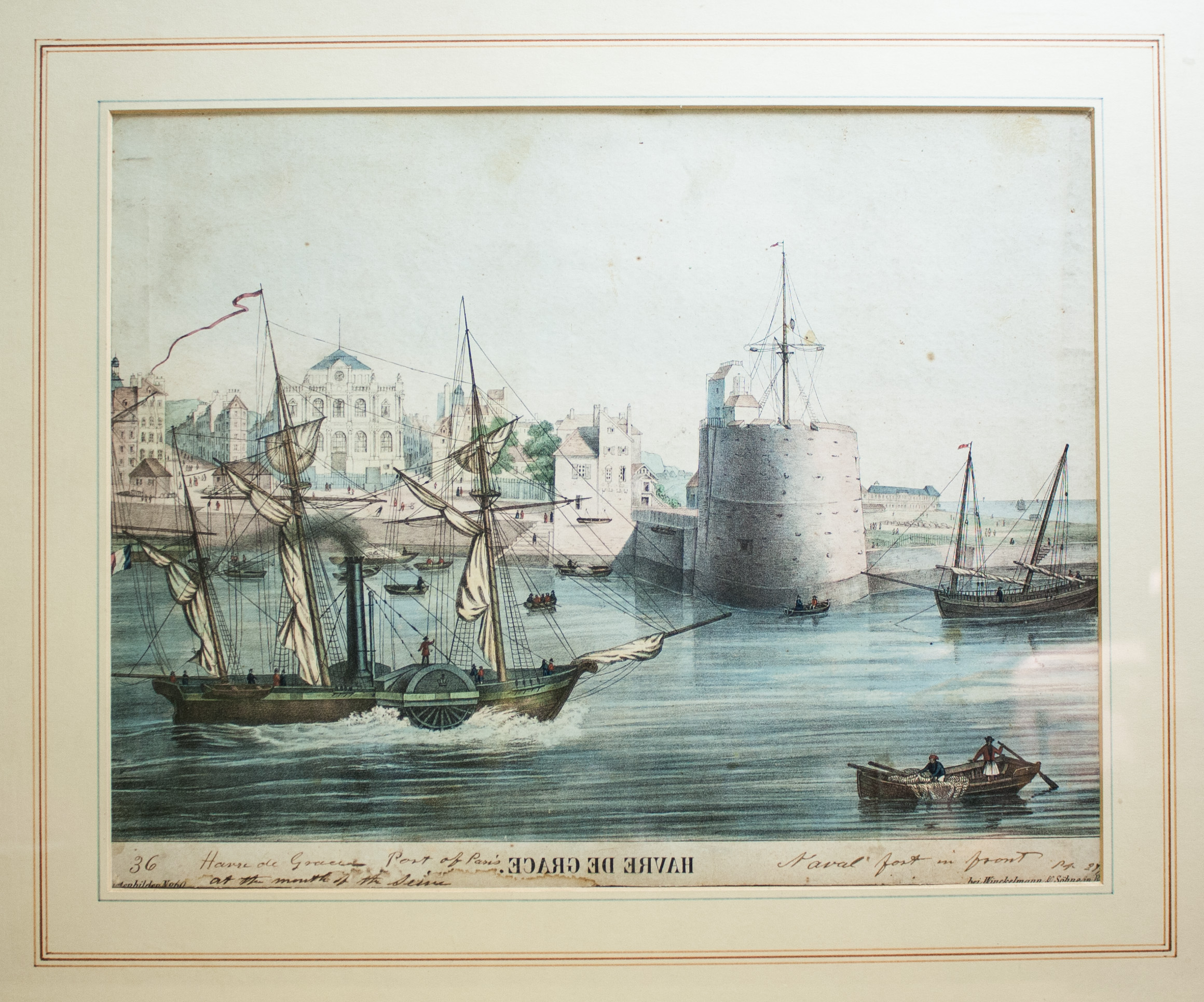
Vue d'optique of Havre de Grace Port of Paris printed in Germany ca. 1800.

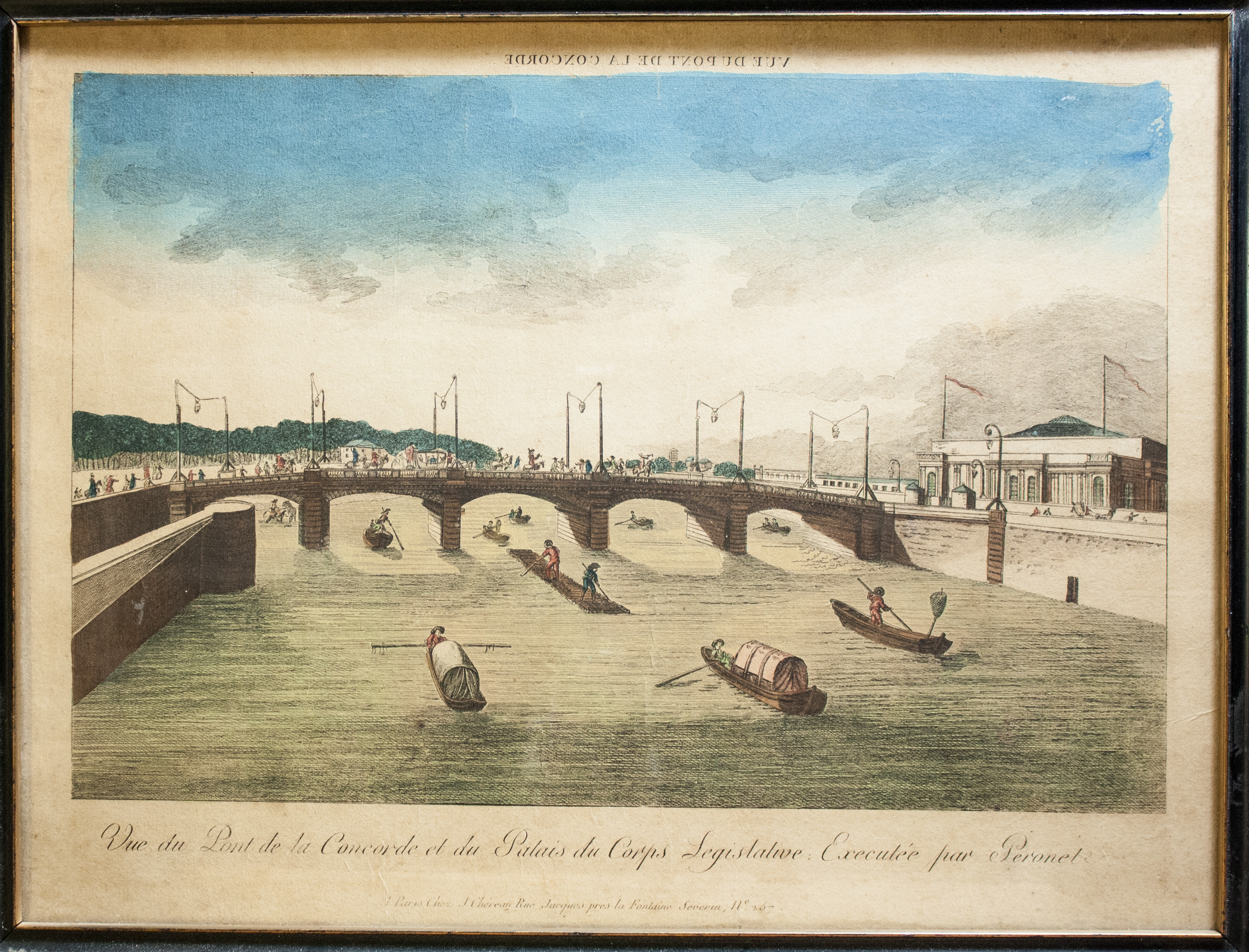
Vue d'optique of the Bridge of La Concorde, Printed in Paris

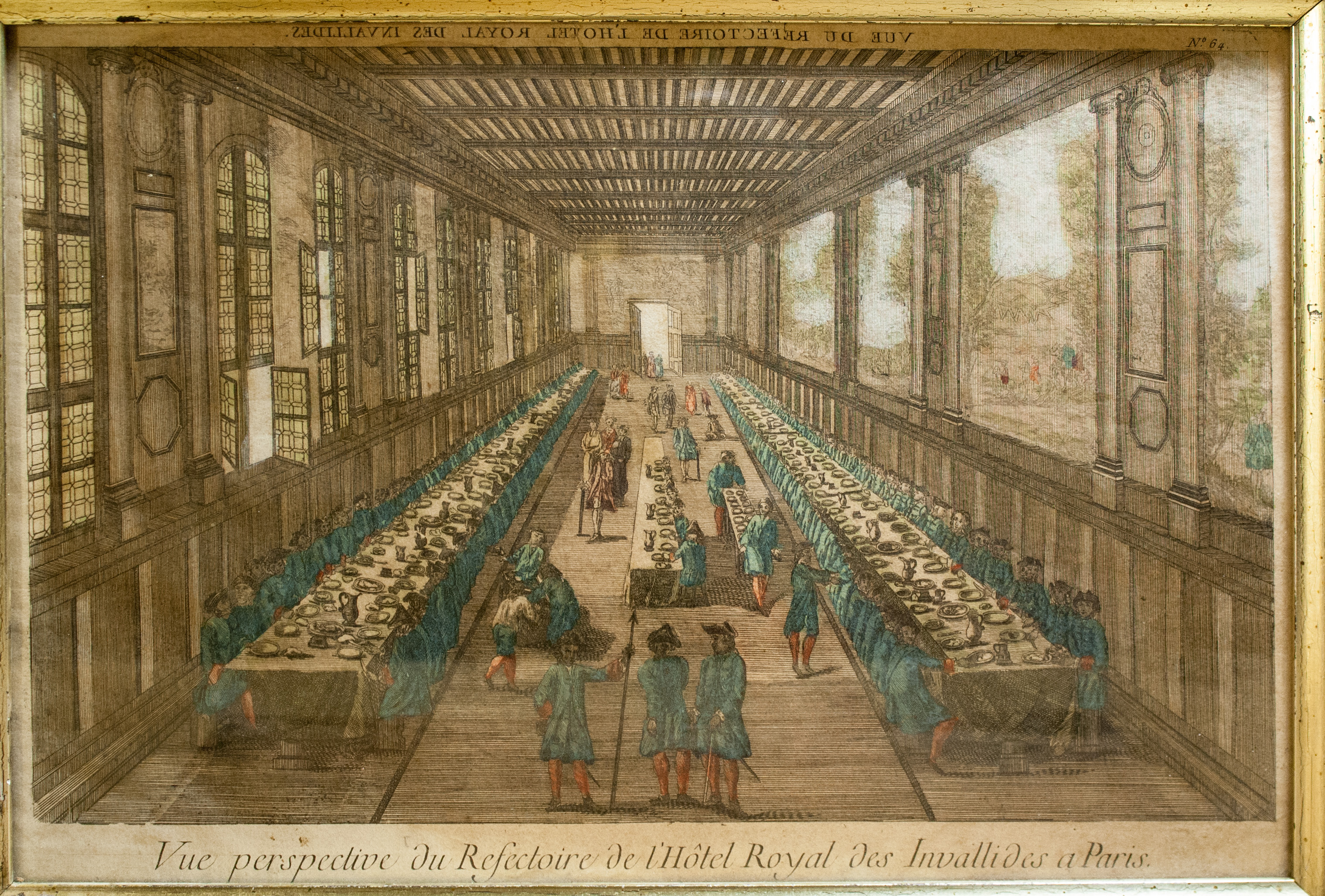
Vue d'optique of the Hotel Royal des Invallides, printed in Paris

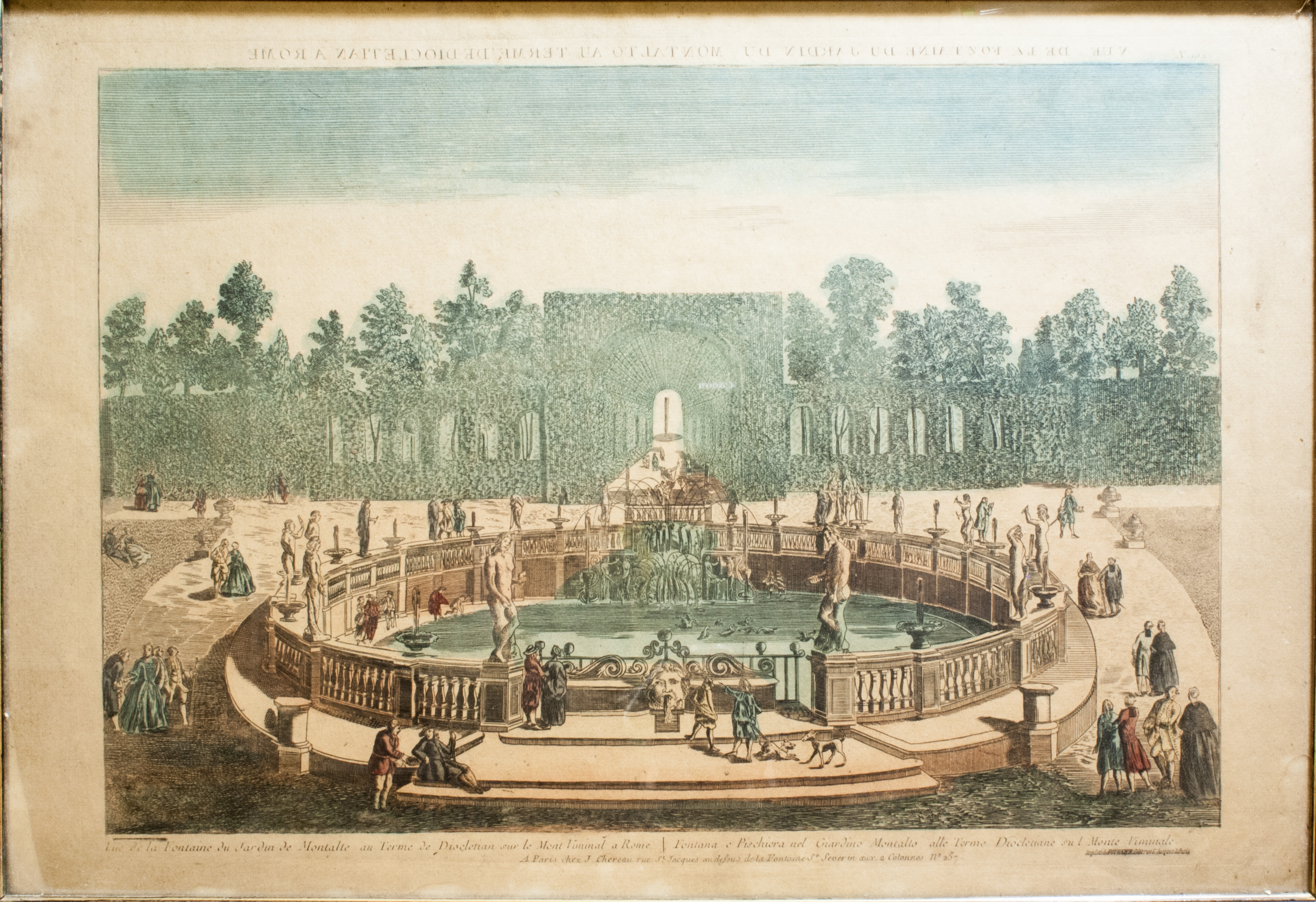
Vue d'optique of Rome, printed in Paris

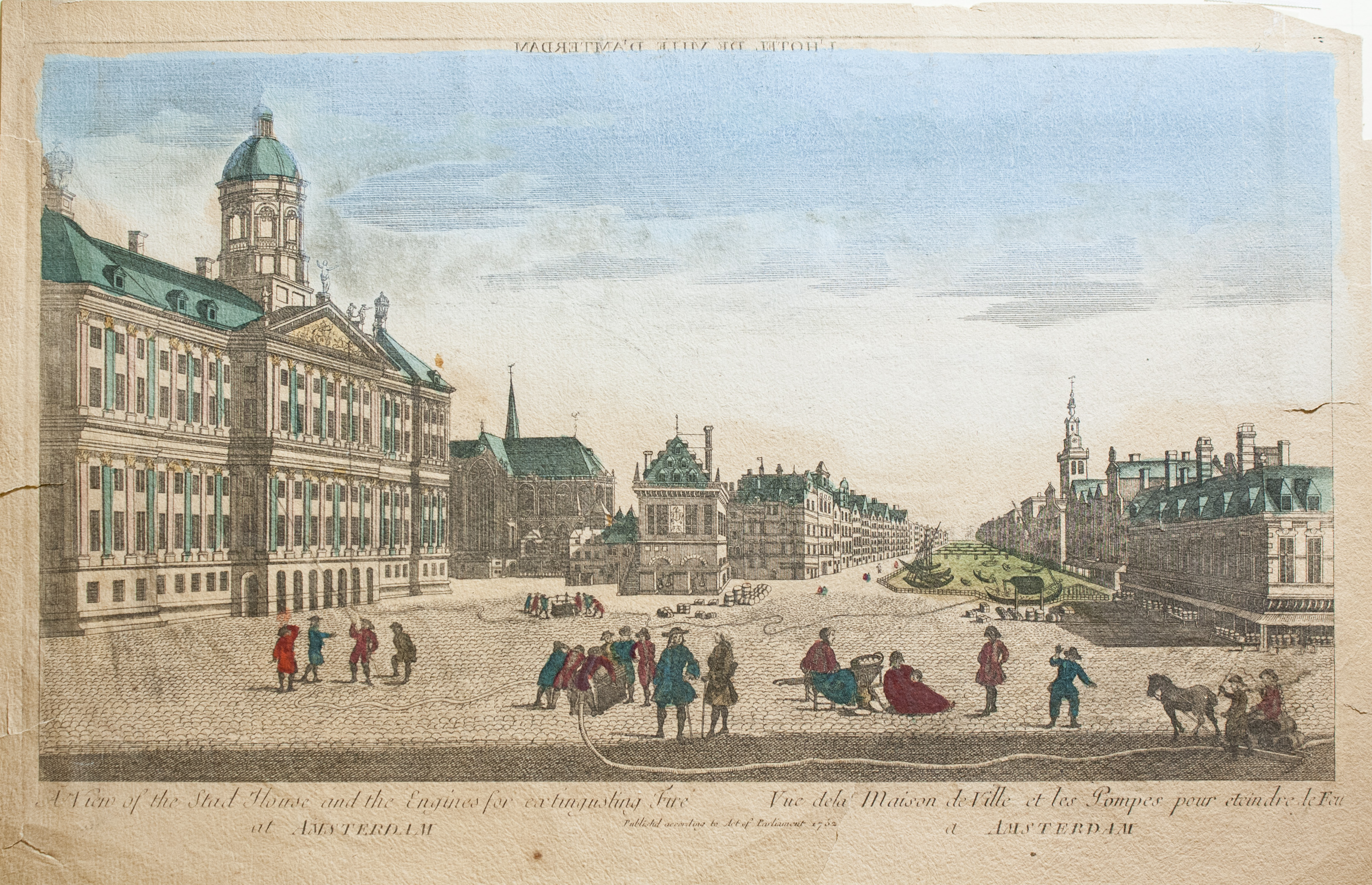
Vue d'optique of the Hotel de Ville in Amsterdam, printed in England
