= Uki-e =

Japanese woodblock prints

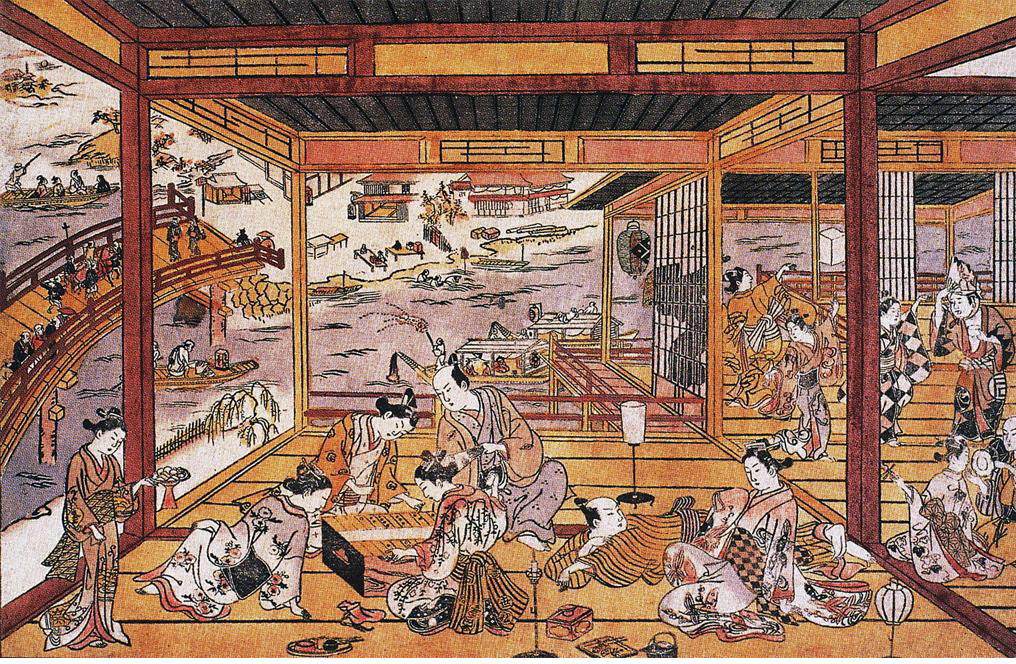
Taking the Evening Cool by Ryōgoku Bridge (1745), Okumura Masanobu This early example of an uki-e print uses Western-style perspective for the interior, but more traditional Japanese technique for the exterior.

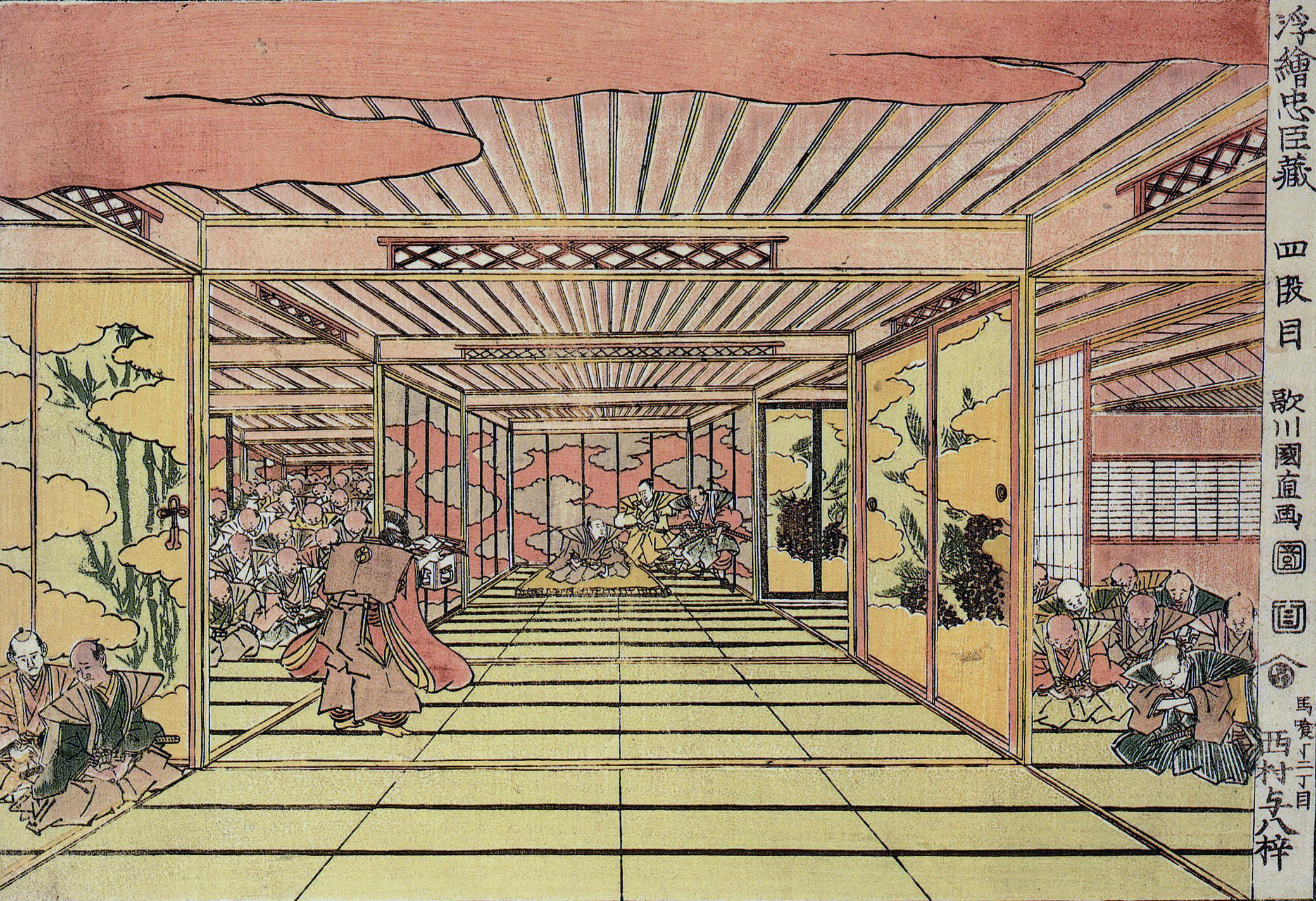
Act Four (Shindamme) from the series Uki-e Chūshingura (c. 1820s), Utagawa Kuninao Collection the Cincinnati Art Museum

Uki-e (浮絵; "floating picture", implying "perspective picture") refers to a genre of ukiyo-e pictures that employs western conventions of linear perspective. Although they never constituted more than a minor genre, pictures in perspective were drawn and printed by Japanese artists from their introduction in the late 1730s through to the mid-nineteenth century.

Around 1739, Okumura Masanobu studied European engravings to learn the rules of perspective. His engravings found their way to Japan either through Dejima or China. Masanobu was the first to apply the term Uki-e to perspective images. However, while early commentators credited him as the first to introduce the style into ukiyo-e prints and paintings altogether, the earliest known printed example is now attributed to Torii Kiyotada, around 1739–40, with Masanobu following shortly after and becoming particularly skilled at depicting interiors. Utagawa Toyoharu fully developed the form in the late 1750s when he produced colored woodblock copies of engravings after Canaletto and Guardi. Toyoharu was also the first to adapt these techniques to Japanese subjects.

The interior of Kabuki theaters was a common subject in Uki-e prints. Interior scenes tend to be favored as it is easier to accurately apply one point perspective to architecture than to landscape.

== See also ==
- Rangaku
- Yokohama-e
- Yōga (art)
