= E-hon =

Japanese term for picture books

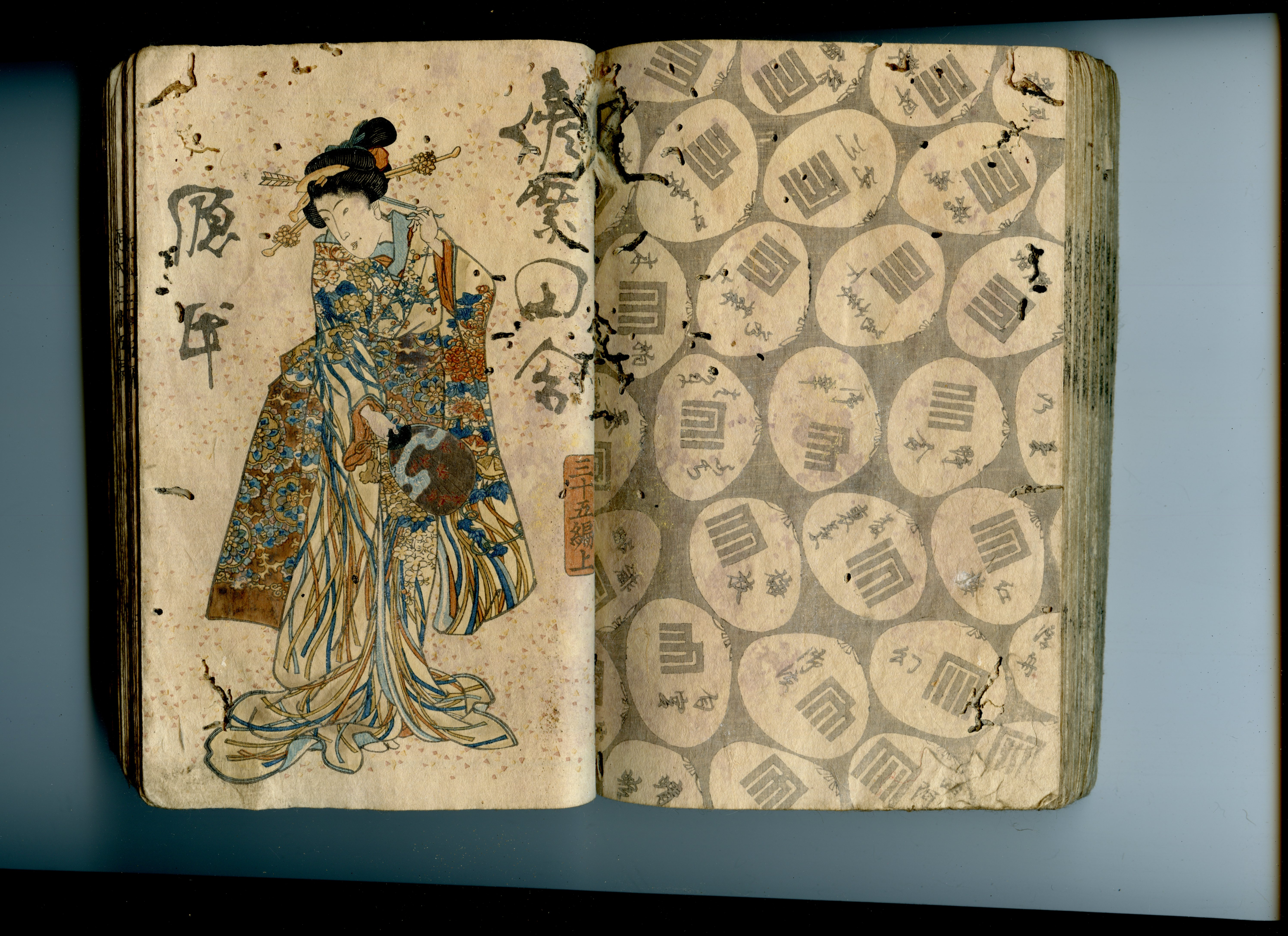
Cover and back of 2 bound-together volumes from the gōkan e-hon series A Country Genji by an Imitation Murasaki (Nise Murasaki inaka Genji)

E-hon (絵本; or ehon) is the Japanese term for picture books. It may be applied in the general sense, or may refer specifically to a type of woodblock printed illustrated volume published in the Edo period (1603–1867).

A distinctive element of Tokugawa Japanese book culture, e-hon were intended as much for viewing as for reading. Covering an array of subjects, they combined images with brief captions, poems or short essays depicted in elegant calligraphy. This style of brief narrative text accompanying each illustration has led to ehon being referred to as the forerunners of modern Japanese manga or cartoon books. Early ehon were printed monochromatically until color was introduced in the eighteenth century through printing techniques adapted from China. Their visual richness and narrative versatility made them accessible to a wide audience, helping to bridge elite artistic traditions with the tastes of an expanding urban readership. In this way, ehon played a key role in shaping the development of illustrated storytelling in Japan.

The first e-hon were religious items with images by Buddhist painters. Those from the Muromachi period are typically known as nara-ehon. In the early modern period (1600–1868) illustrated books exploded in popularity. They covered a diverse range of subjects with experimentation in production techniques.

E-hon production was a significant part of the Japanese publishing industry (particularly) during the 19th century; most Japanese woodblock print artists of the period produced e-hon designs (often in large quantities), as commercial work.

Toward the end of the 19th century, e-hon chapter-books were eclipsed in popularity by the new "Western" concept of literary magazines. These were larger books which contained more, and a wider range of material per-issue, but usually fewer pictures (measured on a text-to-images ratio). They often used more modern printing methods; the increase in production costs was offset by increased efficiency, larger-scale printing and distribution, and the introduction of advertising. Typically, a magazine would include one large folded, polychrome illustration referencing some "feature" story in the volume, as a frontispiece. Such pictures, woodblock-printed in colour, are known as kuchi-e. The new format also absorbed most of the remaining talent and market for ukiyo-e style prints.

== Notable e-hon ==
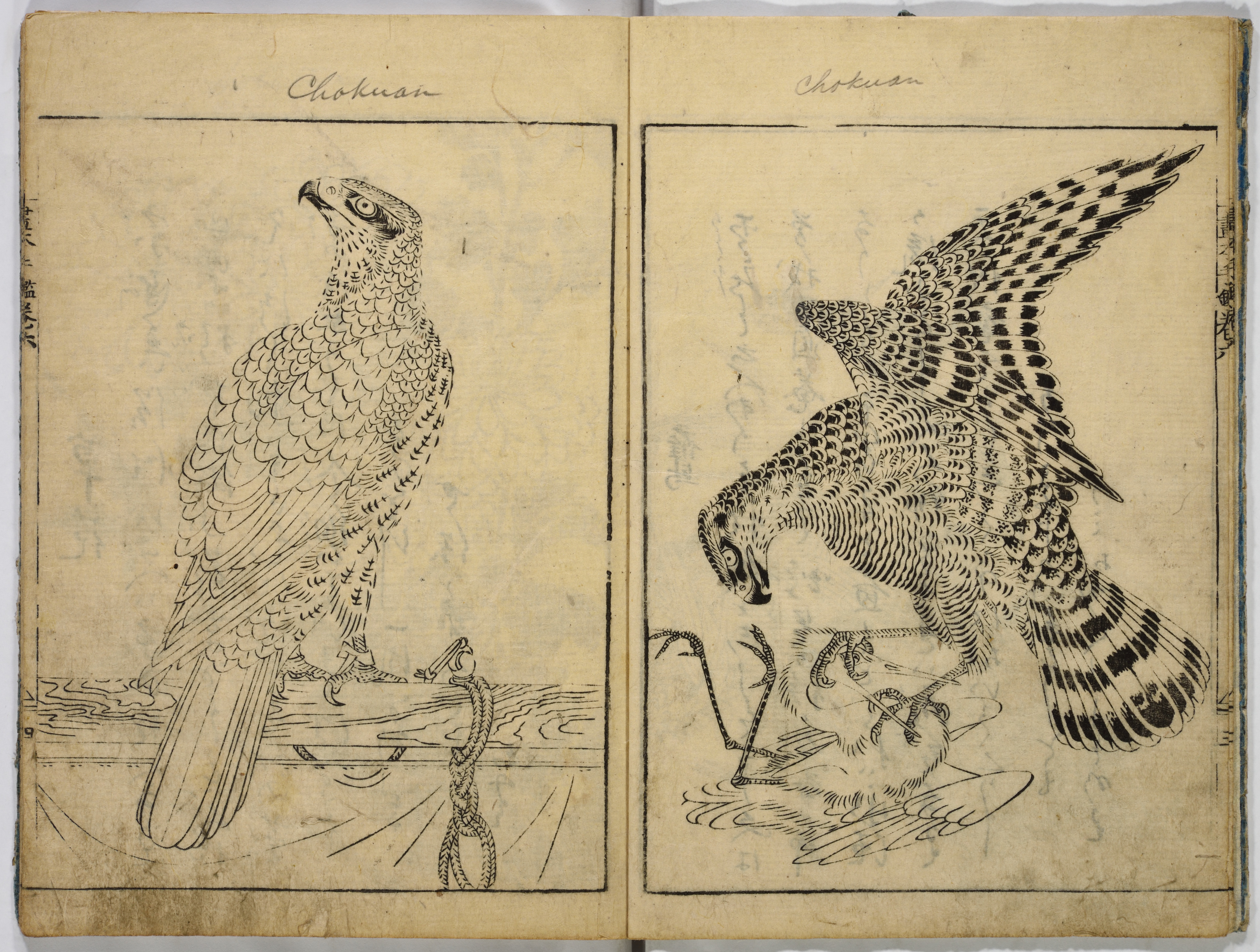
Pages from Ōoka Shunboku's Ehon tekagami, 1720

Artist manuals or model books (edehon) were treasured by art schools and became popular with the public. Although printed books were commonly considered as low-brow media, students of the leading artistic school of the Edo period, the Kanoh-ha school, produced their own edehon. This weaving together of elite artists with popular print culture coincides with the character of the eighteenth century when high and low culture converged. Ōoka Shunboku's Ehon tekagami ('Hand mirror') of 1720 demonstrated characteristic styles of different artists. Illustrations which were either handpainted or stenciled appear in his Minchō shiken of 1746, based on the successful Chinese Manual of the Mustard Seed Garden of 1679 which was released as a Japanese version, Kaishien gaden, in 1748.

In 1765 polychrome woodblock printing was developed in Edo. The prints were called nishiki-e, 'brocade pictures', because of their similarity to color silk brocades (nishiki). The first large-scale commercial book with full-color printing was Ehon butai ōgi in 1770, with artwork by ukiyo-e artists Katsukawa Shunshō and Ippitsusai Bunchō. The book featured realistic depictions of kabuki actors (nigao-e) and was popular with theatergoers. Ukiyoe prints always centered around kabuki actors and courtesans and aimed to portray the lively atmosphere of Edo pleasure quarters. The same year saw the publication of Tachibana Minkō's Shokunin burui which was colored with a stenciling technique known as kappazuri. It depicted craftsmen at work at was immediately successful. Also published in 1770 was Ehon seirō bijin awase by Suzuki Harunobu which combined hokku poetry with images of courtesans from the Yoshiwara brothel district.

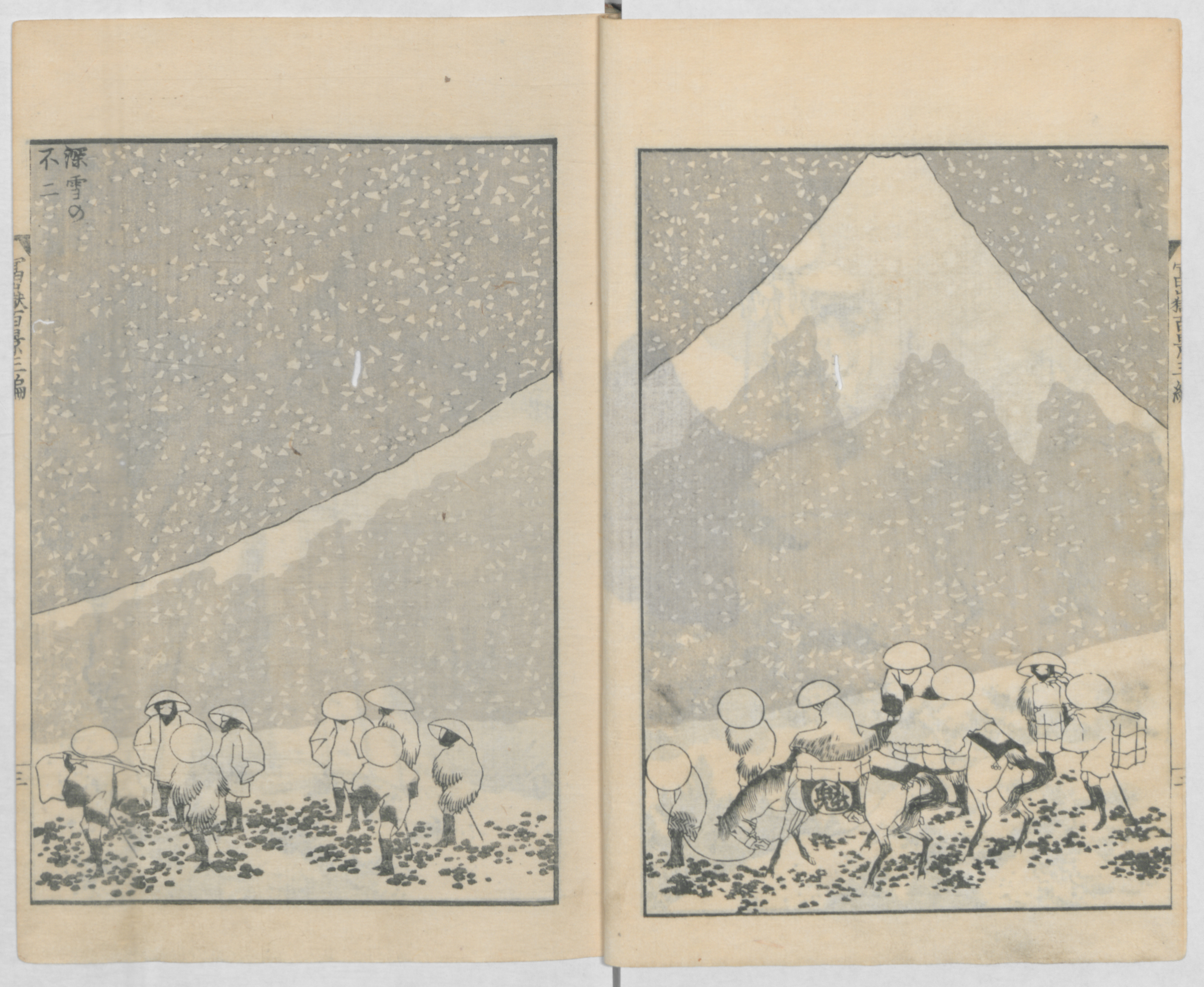
Pages from Hokusai's celebrated 100 Views of Mount Fuji

Under Tokugawa rule, the shogunate showed little initiative in promoting publishing. In 1603, it banned the import and reproduction of missionary works and by the early 1700s officials had also prohibited the publishing of current events, unauthorized calendars, erotics, depictions of the pleasure quarters and gossip about samurai. Only Confucian, Buddhist, Shinto, medical and poetic works were allowed. Censorship measures were unevenly enforced and largely ineffective. Despite these restrictions, a vibrant culture of print publishing continued to flourish, with publishers and readers finding ways to produce and circulate popular texts. This period thus saw the coexistence of official control and a thriving, dynamic literary marketplace. In 1790 the Tokugawa shogunate introduced severe censorship laws for publishers. They targeted "luxurious" works and for a while publishers ceased production of color woodblock-printed books.

The famous ukiyo-e artist Hokusai worked on dozens of e-hon early in his career. In 1814 the first volume of his Hokusai manga was published which featured hundreds of drawings colored with gray and rose pink tones. Its popularity with multiple subsequent volumes appears to have influenced other publishers to use a simplified palette of subdued color. One of the finest ehon works is his 100 Views of Mount Fuji released in 1834–1835 in two volumes by Nishimuraya Yohachi with extremely fine carving by the workshop of Egawa Tomekichi and exquisite grey gradations (bokashi). It is seen as the pinnacle of monochrome printing.

== Nara-ehon ==
Nara picture books, or Nara-ehon, are lavishly handmade illustrated manuscripts which date from the mid-16th century to the late 17th-century. The contents of these manuscripts consists mostly of otogi-zōshi which are short narratives concerning war epics, folklore or Shinto and Buddhist legends. Nara-ehon loosely refers to manuscripts that are either in book or scroll formats. The term is believed to emanate from illustrators who came from major Buddhist temples in and around the Nara region, such as Tōdai-ji and Kōfuku-ji or the Kasuga-taisha. The manuscripts are decorated with ink, colour pigments, gold, as well as silver-decorated endleaves. When the amount of commissions from the nobility at these temples declined, the artists left for Kyoto to set up studios and took orders for work, similar to local painters.

== Manufacture ==
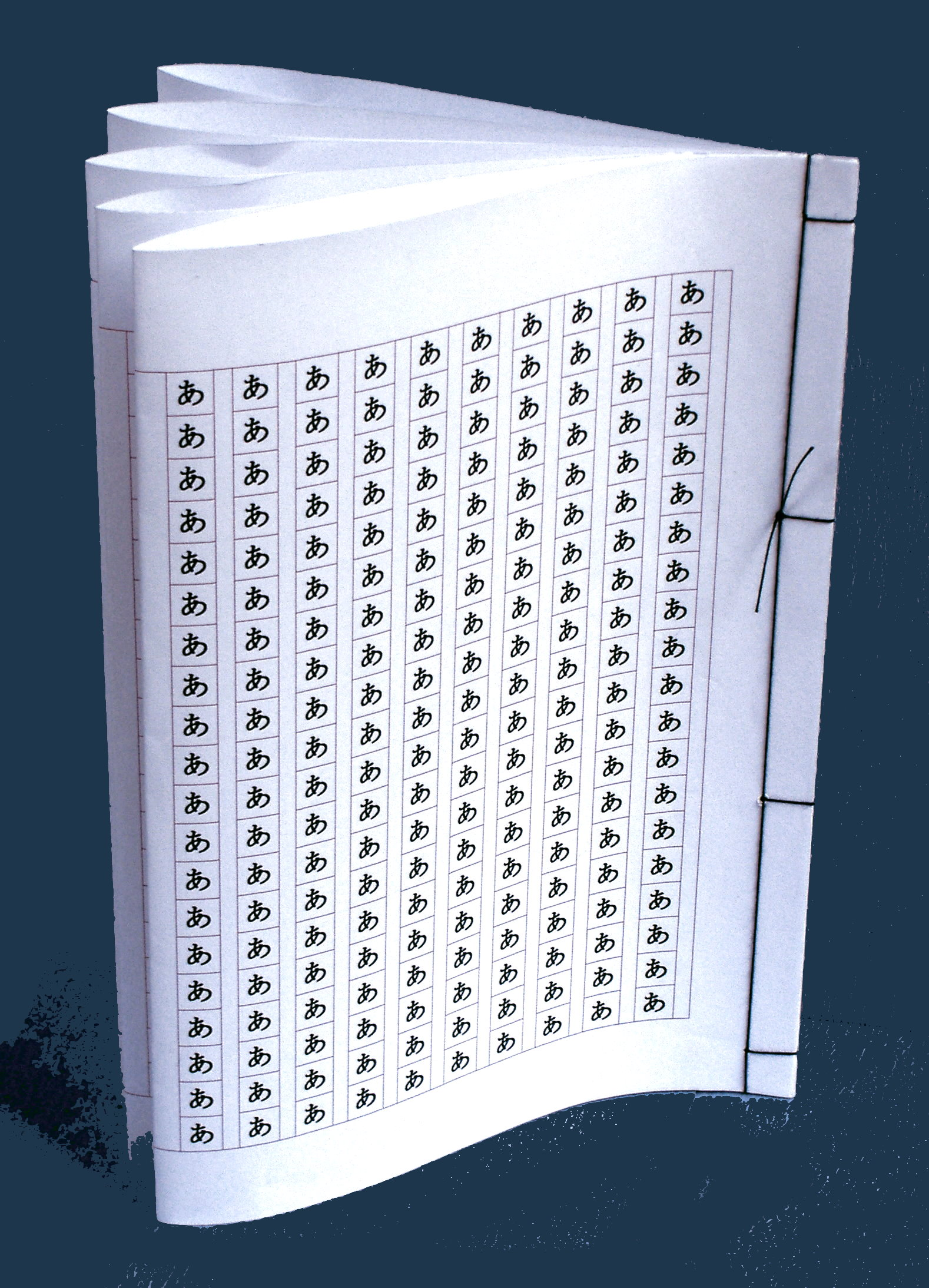
Fukurotoji binding

Most e-hon of the Edo period were made with side-stitched binding. They used highly durable washi paper. A page is made from a single sheet printed on one side which is folded printed side out. These folded sheets are bound at their open ends with cords of twisted paper which go through two holes made in the stack of sheets. The bookcover is glued to blank outer pages and attached to the stack of pages with a hemp cord stitched through four holes which penetrate the covers and book block. This method of binding is called fukurotoji.

== See also ==
- Japanese books
- Kuchi-e
