= Egawa Tomekichi =

Japanese woodblock carver

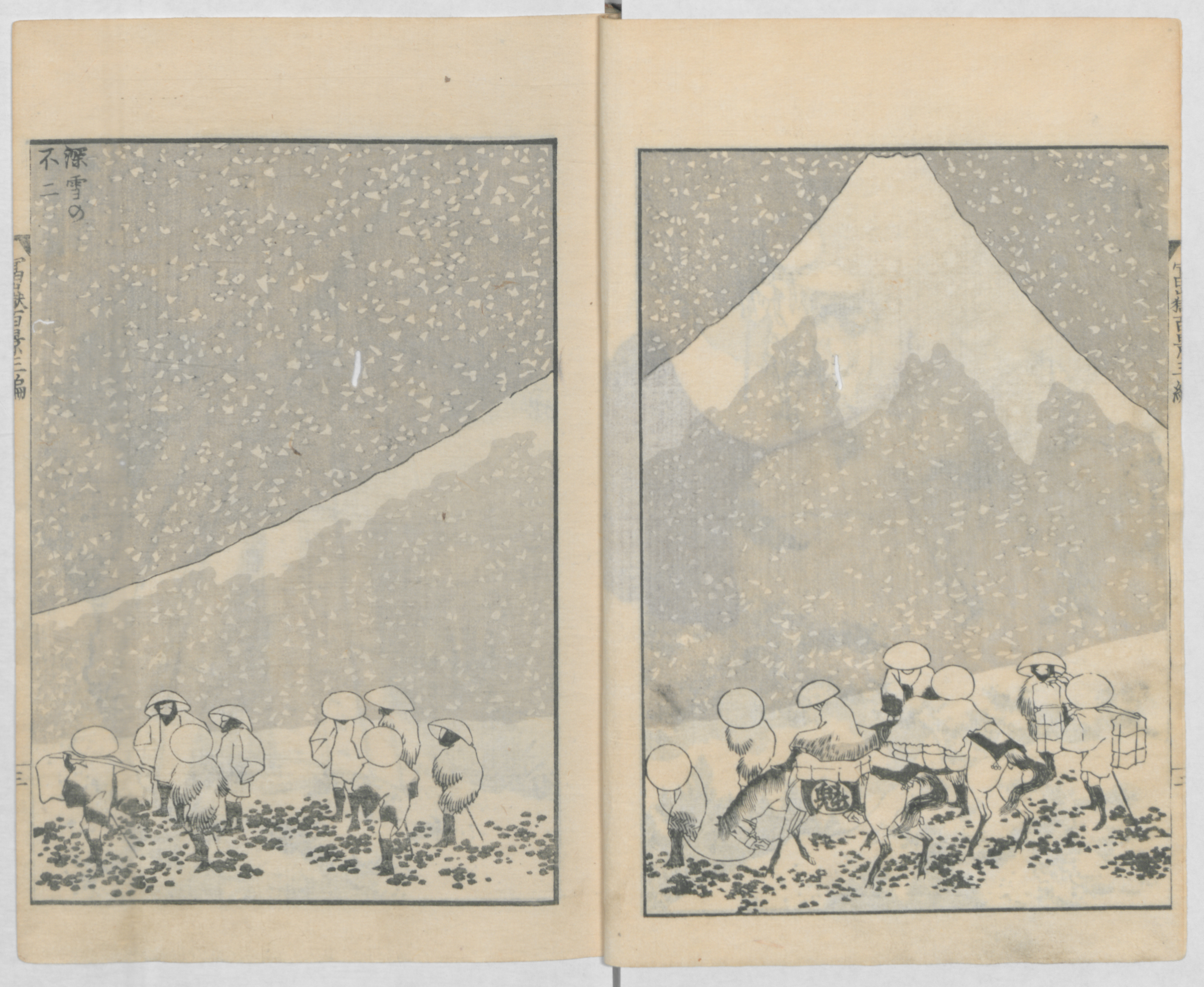
Page from Hokusai's 100 Views of Mount Fuji

Egawa Tomekichi (fl. c. 1830–1850) was a master carver of Japanese woodblock prints in Edo period Japan.

He is known for his exceptional work on Hokusai's illustrated books (e-hon) such as the Hokusai Manga and his 100 Views of Mount Fuji which is considered a masterpiece of the artform.

Hokusai had studied carving as an apprentice and as an exceptional draughtsman, he relied on the woodblock carver to accurately replicate the quality of his line when it came to printing. In an 1835 letter sent to various publishers, he complained about the standard of cutting in earlier editions of his Manga, Musha-e zukushi, and other books, and urged repeatedly that they employ Egawa Tomechiki of Asakusa in future. Egawa is credited in the twelfth volume of the Manga published in 1834, and Hokusai praised his work on his recently issued 100 Views of Mount Fuji, writing that: "From the first to the third volume, I found not a single corner of the carving that left me dissatisfied. For this reason, if Egawa were to take care of the carving I should also be more motivated and could concentrate better on my own work ... My one concern is to produce a well-made book."

Previous editions of Hokusai Manga had been well carved but the quality was uneven and varied between work done by the master carver (kashirabori) and that of his assistants (dobori). The 100 Views of Mount Fuji, however, is faultless in execution and is regarded as a masterwork of the genre. Judging from names in the first volume of 100 Views, Egawa ran a workshop of six craftsmen: "Esen", "Bairin", "Wasuke", "Yoshitora", "Hisayuki", and "Yonekichi". Egawa supervised the first two volumes as confirmed by the colophon, but may have appointed Egawa Sentaro ("Esen") to oversee the third.

Of note in Hokusai's 1835 letter is that in return for securing Egawa, he would not take a portion of the woodblock carving fee, which suggests that it was normal practice for an artist to demand a share of the carvers' commission in return for supplying them with work.

== Sources ==
- Kobayashi Tadashi, "Hokusai's Letters" in Calza, Gian Carlo (July 2003). Hokusai. Phaidon Press. ISBN 978-0-7148-4304-9.
- Bouquillard, Jocelyn; Marquet, Christophe (June 2007). Hokusai, First Manga Master. Harry N. Abrams. ISBN 978-0-8109-9341-9.
