= Ōoka Shunboku =

Japanese artist (1680–1763)

- Born: 1680; Kansai region, Japan
- Died: 29 July 1763
- Known for: Painting; Ukiyo-e
- Notable work: Bird-and-flower paintings
- Movement: Ukiyo-e

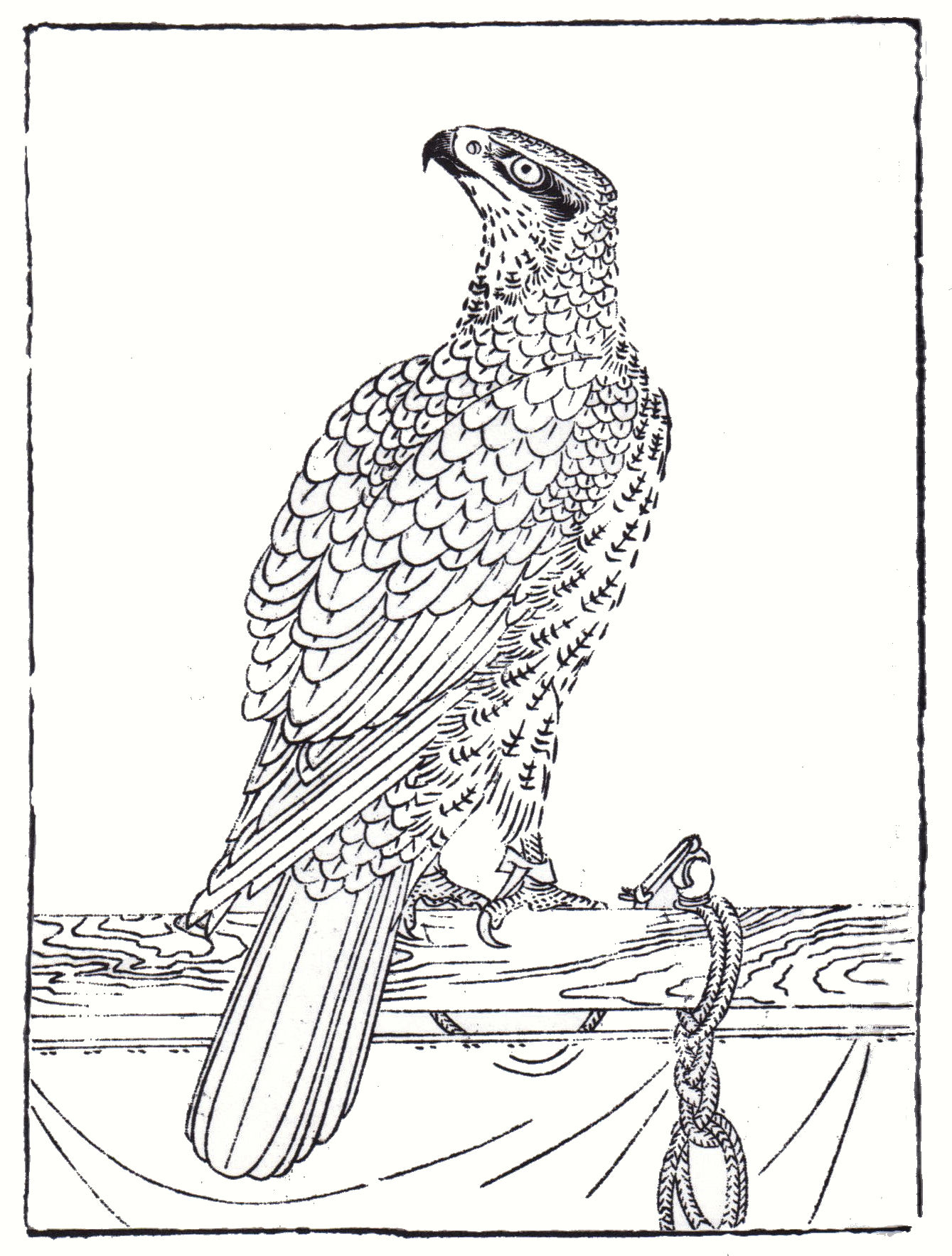
A falcon modeled on the work of Chokuan Soga (1720)

Ōoka Shunboku (Japanese: 大岡 春卜; 1680–1763) was an ukiyo-e artist and painter who was known for his bird-and-flower paintings. Shunboku was born in 1680 in the Kansai region, and lived most of his professional life in Osaka. His common name was Hanshichi, and he used the gō Aitō and Sesseisai; he was a largely self-taught painter and entrepreneur, first dedicating himself to illustrating and reproducing old paintings in the style of the Kanō school.

Throughout his career Shunboku engraved reproductions of famous Chinese and Japanese artists, such as early exponents of the Kanō school. From the late 1710s until shortly before his death, he reproduced numerous paintings for various books. One of these anthologies is Ehon tekagami (1720), an e-hon ("picture book") in which Shunboku attempts to demonstrate the characteristic style of each artist. (A tekagami is a hand mirror.) His notes and citations preserve some otherwise obscure works, and the names of their creators. His efforts helped propagate classic paintings throughout Japan. In 1746 he published the six-volume Wakan Meigaen, through which he further disseminated images of Japanese and Chinese masterpieces, including reproductions of kasen-e portraits of poets such as Kakinomoto no Hitomaro and Ono no Komachi, works by artists of the Tosa school, scenes from The Tale of Genji, and illustrations of The Tales of Ise attributed to Tosa Mitsuoki. He followed this in 1751 with the six-volume Gashi Kaiyō, a set of representative paintings from Korea, China and Japan, and in 1761 with the Soga Banran, a compendium of pictorial studies, which was popular enough to be reprinted in 1793, thirty years after his death. Shunboku's ehon served as manuals for artists including Itō Jakuchū and the noted collector Kimura Kenkadō, stimulating their interest in Ming-dynasty Chinese painters whose works, held in Japanese monastic collections, thereby became accessible for study. His pupil Takehara Shunchōsai (1772–1801) is particularly remembered for the 1780 ehon Miyako Meisho Zue.

== See also ==
- List of Japanese artists
- List of ukiyo-e terms
- Schools of ukiyo-e artists
- Woodblock printing in Japan
