= Chigusa =

- Gender: Female

Origin
- Origin: Japanese
- Meaning: Different meanings depending on the kanji used

Chigusa (written: 千種, 千草 or ちぐさ in hiragana) is a feminine Japanese given name. Notable people with the name include:

- Chigusa Ikeda (池田 千草; born 1976), Japanese voice actress
- Chigusa Kitani (木谷 千種; 1895–1947), Japanese painter
- Chigusa Nagayo (長与 千種; born 1964), Japanese professional wrestler
- Chigusa Takaku (高久 ちぐさ; born 1978), Japanese actress

Chigusa (written: 千種) is also a Japanese surname. Notable people with the surname include:

- Nobuo Chigusa (千種 信雄; born 1948), Japanese basketball player
- Chigusa Kotoko (千種 任子; born 1855 - 1944), Japanese concubine of Emperor Meiji

== Fictional characters ==
- Chigusa Fukasawa, a supporting character in Iroduku: The World in Colors
- Chigusa Kisaragi, a supporting character in The Idolmaster series
