= One Hundred Views of Mount Fuji =

Series of illustrated books by Hokusai

- 富嶽百景 (Japanese), Fugaku hyakkei (Japanese)
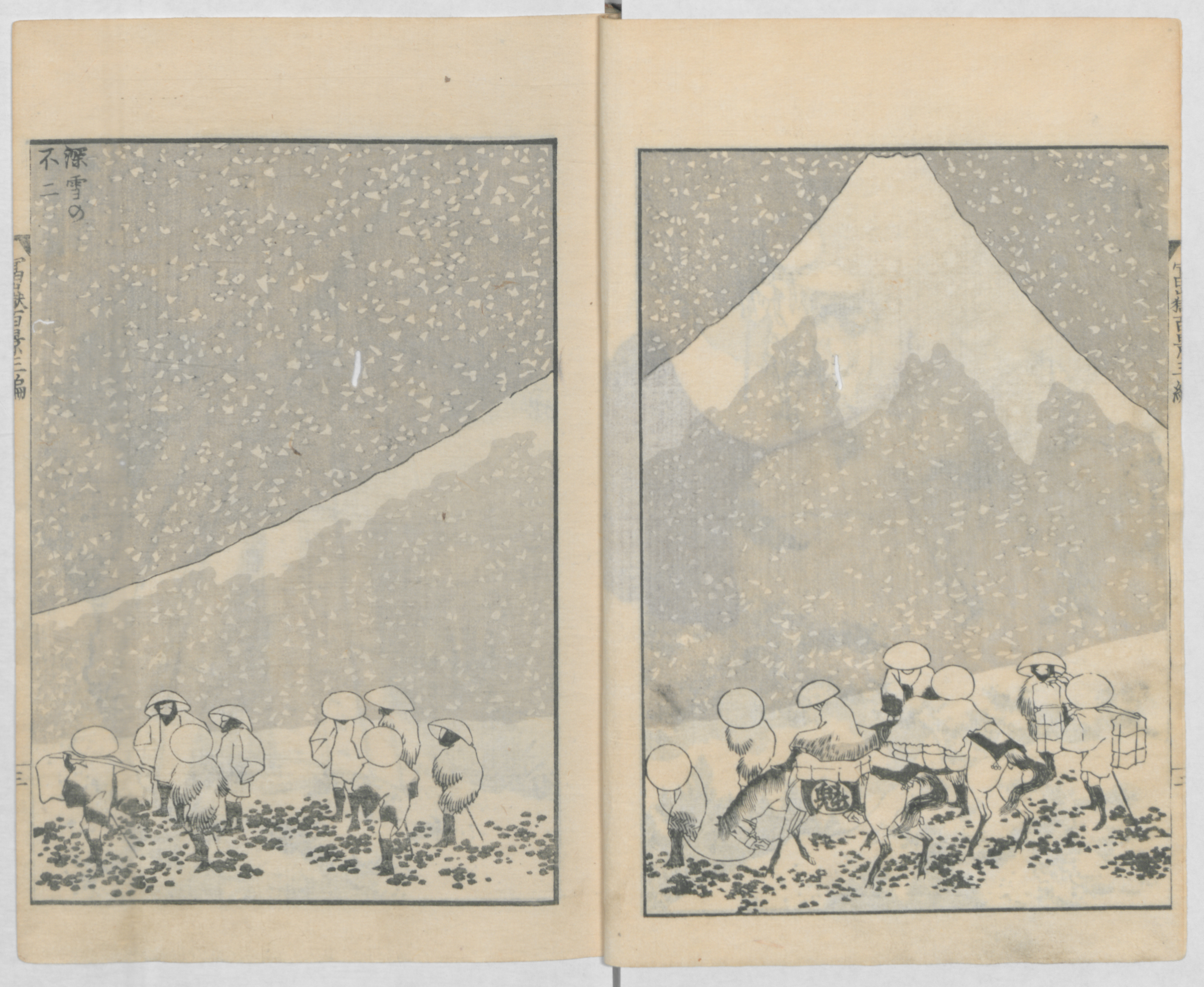
- Artist: Katsushika Hokusai
- Year: 1834, 1835, c. 1849
- Type: Illustrated books

One Hundred Views of Mount Fuji (Japanese: 富嶽百景, Hepburn: Fugaku hyakkei) is a series of three illustrated books by Japanese ukiyo-e artist Hokusai. It is considered one of Japan's most exceptional illustrated books (e-hon), and alongside the Hokusai Manga, the most influential in the West. The first two volumes were published in 1834 and 1835, shortly after completion of his seminal Thirty-six Views of Mount Fuji, with a third released in the late 1840s.

The books contain over a hundred views of Mount Fuji in various styles and settings; Hokusai shows the peak in pure landscapes, with flora and fauna, in religious and mythological scenes and with different atmospheric effects, but above all, he focuses on ordinary people at work.

The first two volumes are celebrated for their very high standards of woodblock printing, with "extremely fine cutting" and "exquisite gradation" (bokashi) of the grey blocks; they have been called a "masterpiece of monochrome printing".

== Publication ==
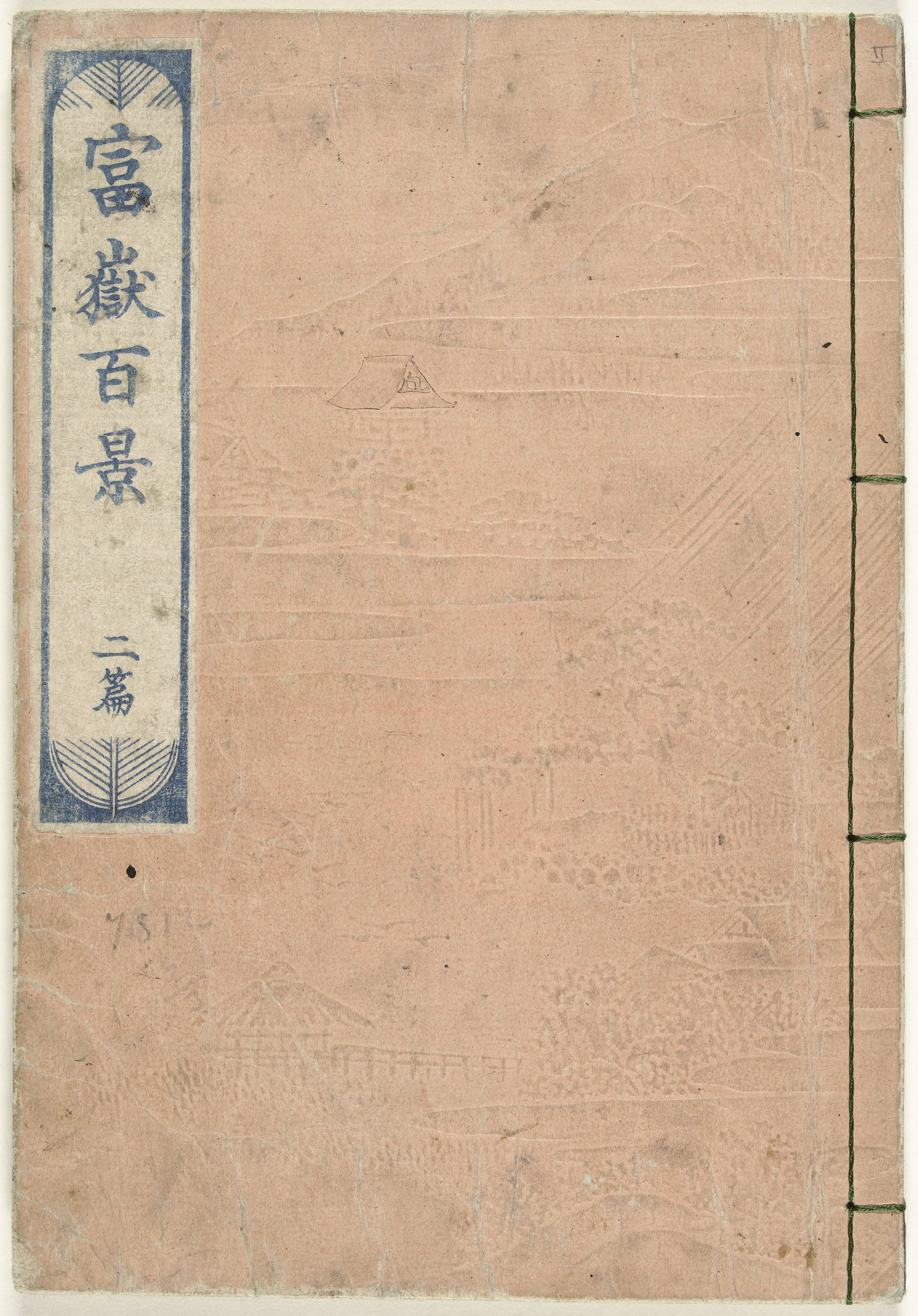
Volume two of Hokusai's Fuji book; pink cover with embossed landscape; top left blue and white 'falcon feather' title strip

The first two volumes have embossed pink covers and feature what is known as a "falcon-feather" title slip. They were published by Nishimuraya Yohachi, who had issued the Thirty-six Views of Mount Fuji, and Nishimura Sukezo in 1834 and 1835. The blocks were cut by the workshop of Egawa Tomekichi and are praised for their extremely high quality. Eirakuya Toshiro of Nagoya, publisher of the Hokusai Manga, issued the third volume, which is not as well printed as the first two. The date of publication is not known with certainty; the third is conventionally dated to 1849, though some prefer a date several years earlier.

The first volume is inscribed by the artist: "From the brush of the former Hokusai Iitsu changing name to Manji, the old man crazy about painting" (Saki no Hokusai Iitsu aratame Gakyo Rojin Manji hitsu). The book is the first major project of his to use the name "Manji" which he wrote with a character meaning ten thousand, a symbol of longevity. In a later pressing, at the age of seventy-five, he added his famous autobiographical colophon:

From the age of six I had a penchant for copying the form of things, and from about fifty, my pictures were frequently published; but until the age of seventy, nothing that I drew was worthy of notice. At seventy-three years, I was somewhat able to fathom the growth of plants and trees, and the structure of birds, animals, insects, and fish. Thus, when I reach eighty years, I hope to have made increasing progress, and at ninety to see further into the underlying principles of things, so that at one hundred years I will have achieved a divine state in my art, and at one hundred and ten, every dot and every stroke will be as though alive. Those of you who live long enough, bear witness that these words of mine prove not false.

== Subject matter ==
Coming soon after the publication of his famous Thirty-six Views of Mount Fuji, Hokusai continued his "artistic and spiritual exploration" of the mountain. Whereas the Thirty-six Views largely consists of images drawn from reality, this work features few designs rooted in a specific place. The preface to volume three describes the compositions as "eccentric". Henry Smith states the books show how Hokusai saw Fuji as "a powerful reservoir of immortality that would assist him in his personal quest to live beyond one hundred years of age and fathom ultimate artistic truths". This obsession with longevity has also been traced to wordplay embedded in the work's very title: the character compound fuji (不死, "immortal") echoes the mountain's name, while the number hyakkei ("hundred") squared yields ten thousand, rendered in kanji as mannen or mandai, a term that in literature carries the meaning of eternity; the character man (万) is in turn evoked by the art name Manji, which Hokusai adopted in his final years.

Art historian Jack Hillier regarded the One Hundred Views as Hokusai's "masterwork" and as a summation of his artistic philosophy and practice.

== Gallery ==
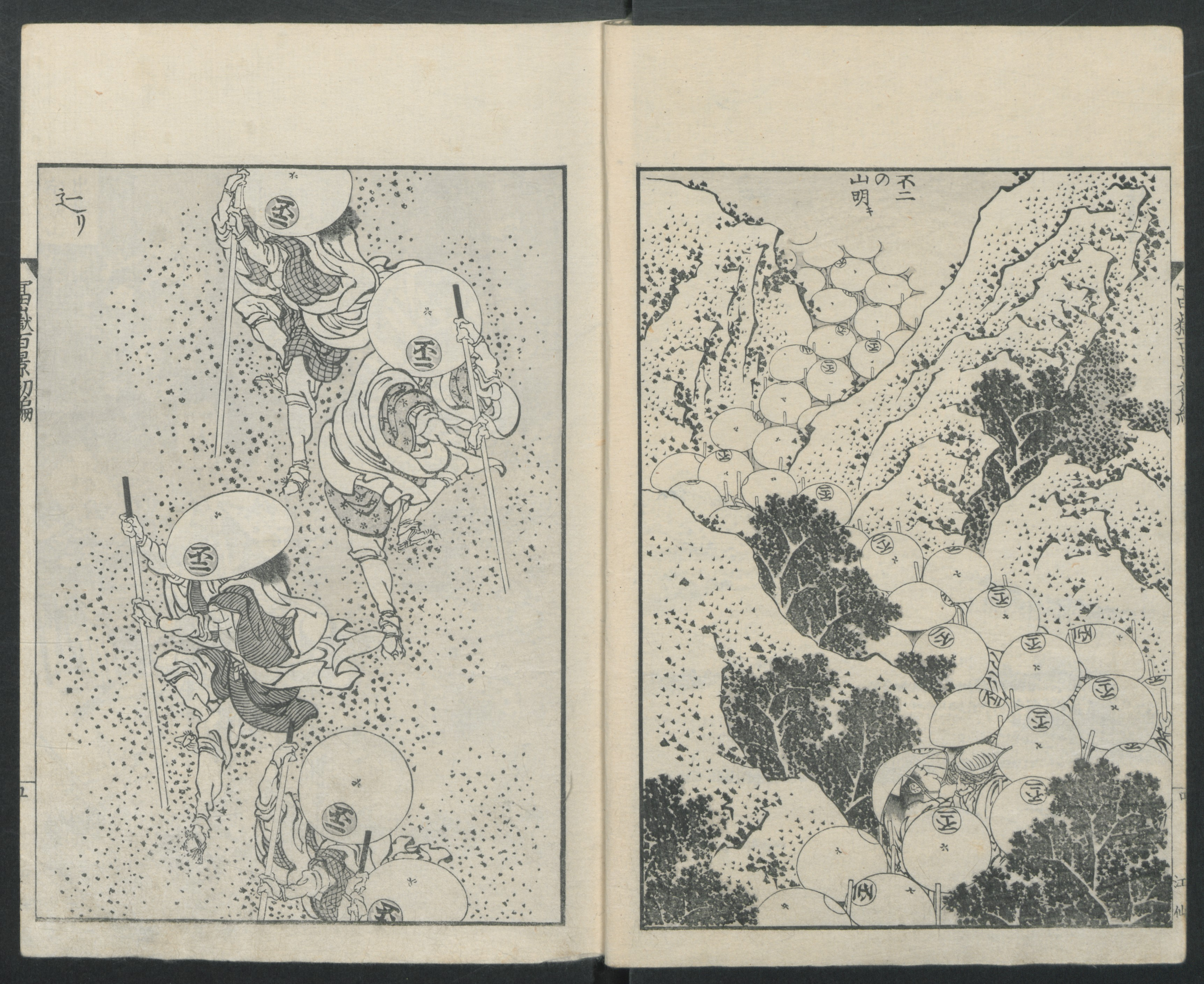

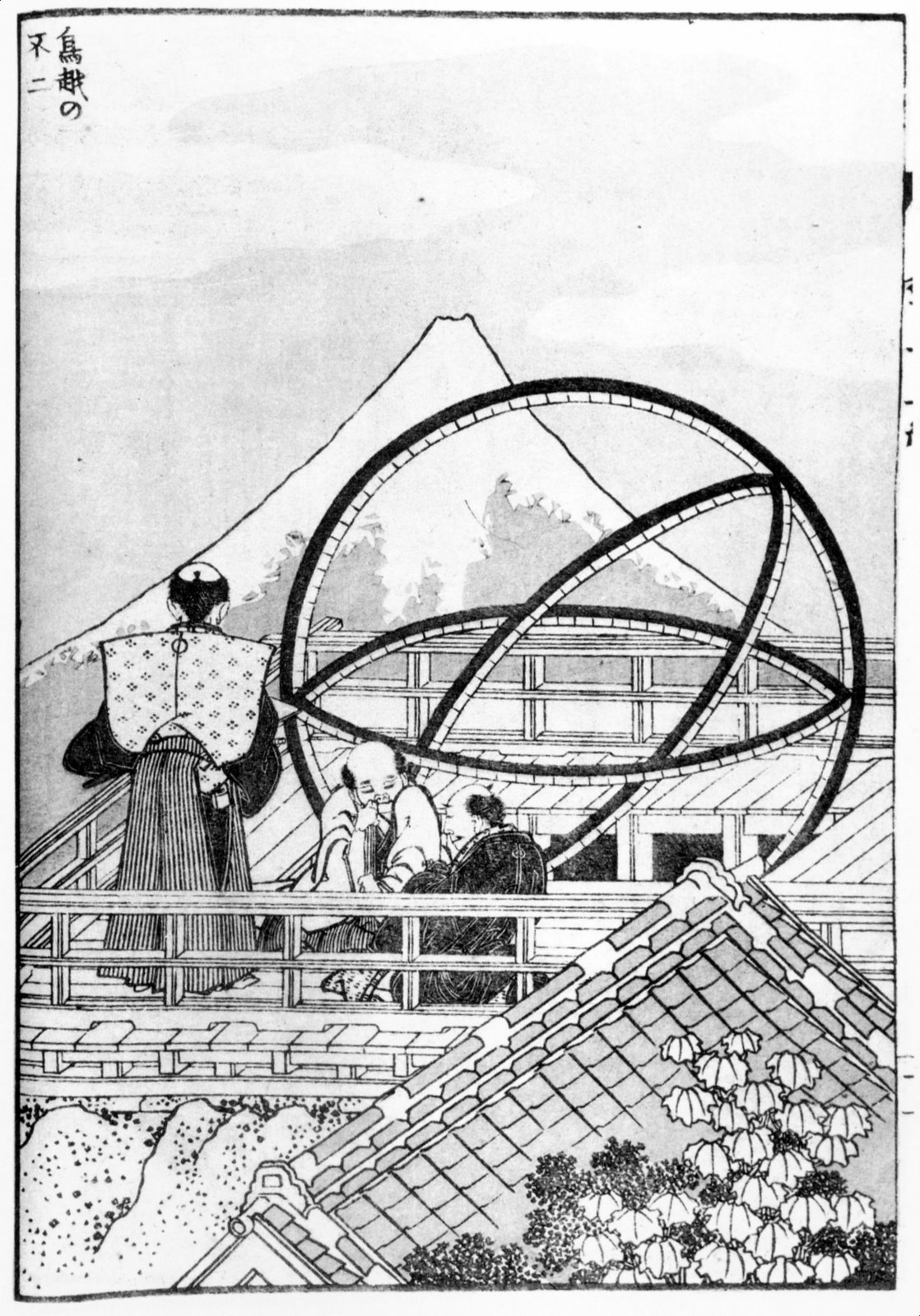
"Fuji at Torigoe", the observatory of the Calendar Bureau

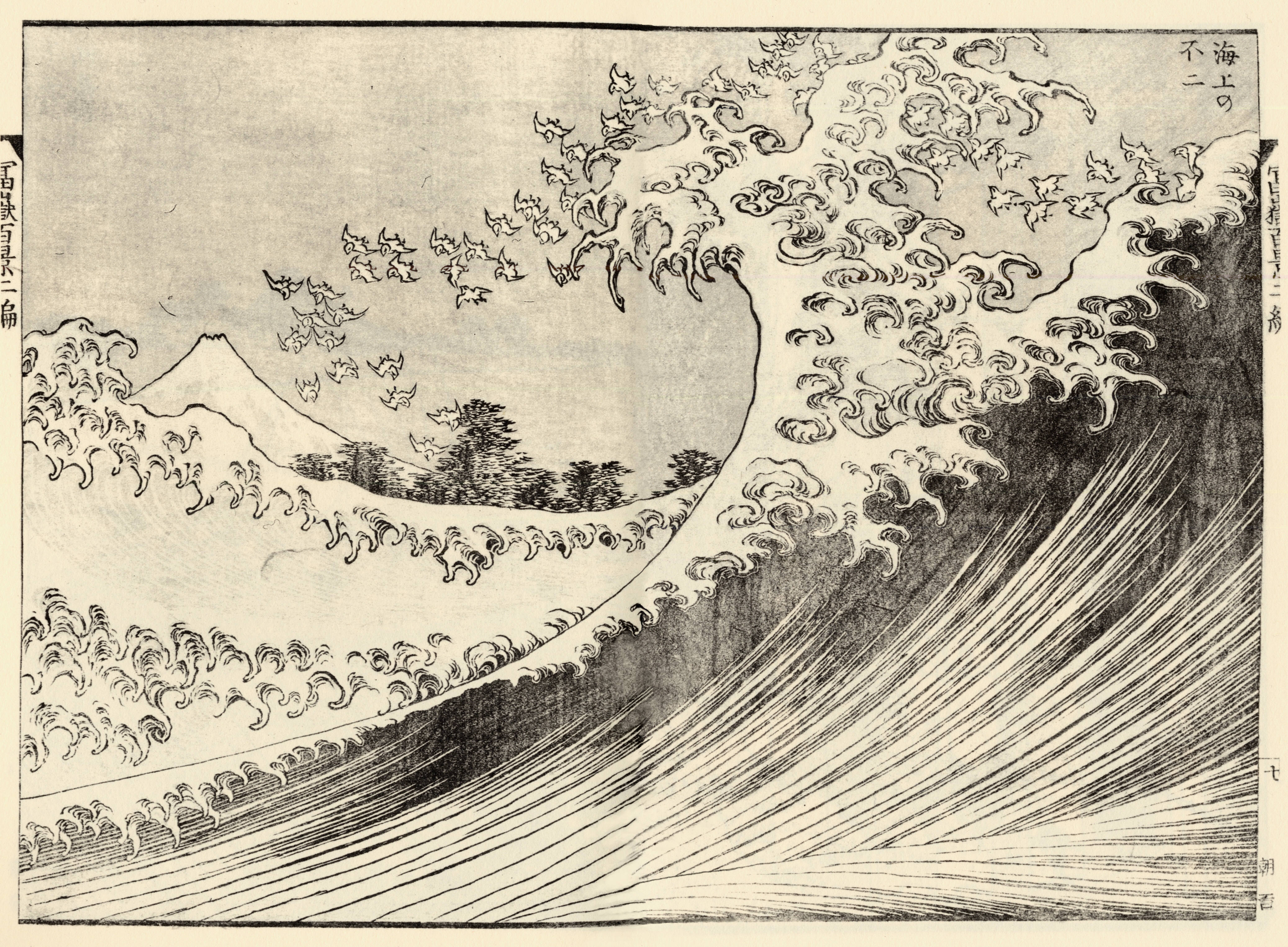
"The Big Wave"

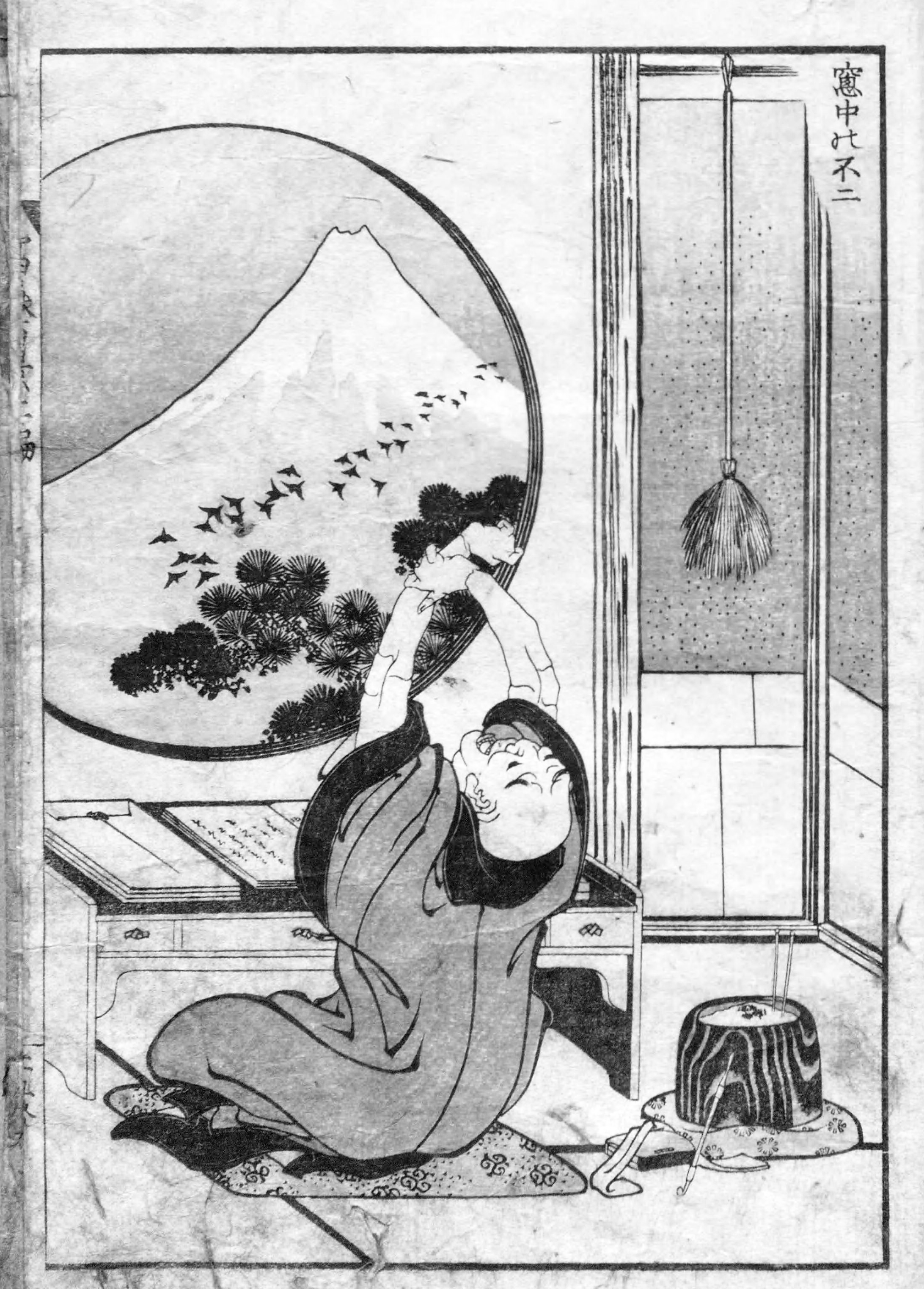
"Into the Window"

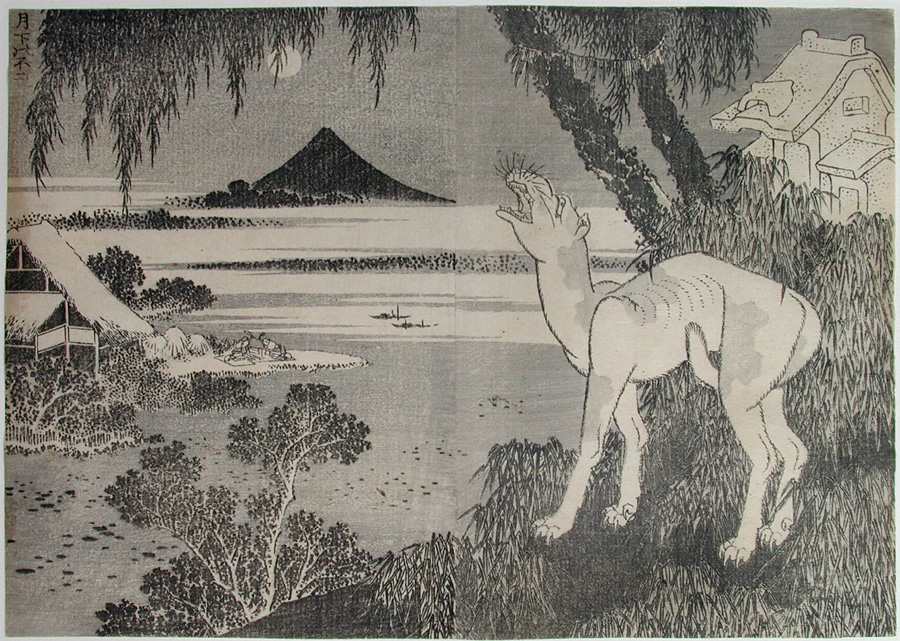
"Fuji Under Moonlight"

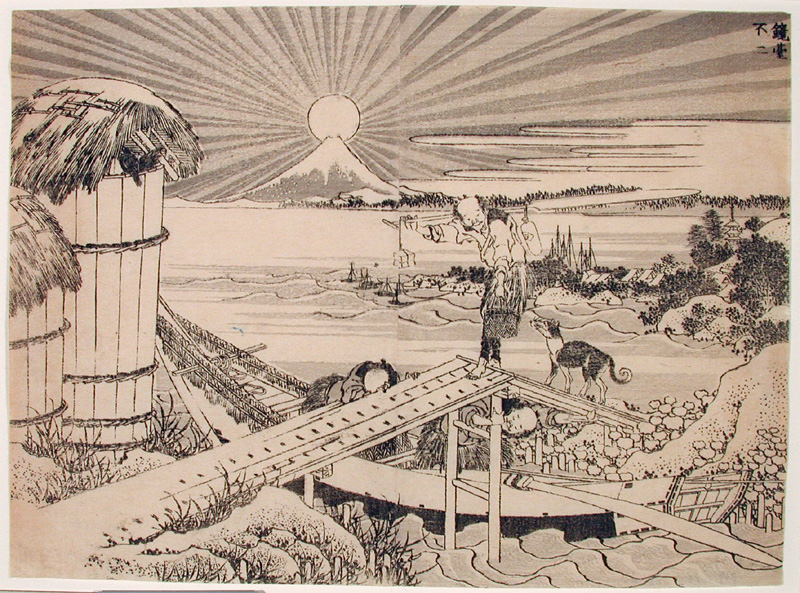
"Mirror-stand Fuji"

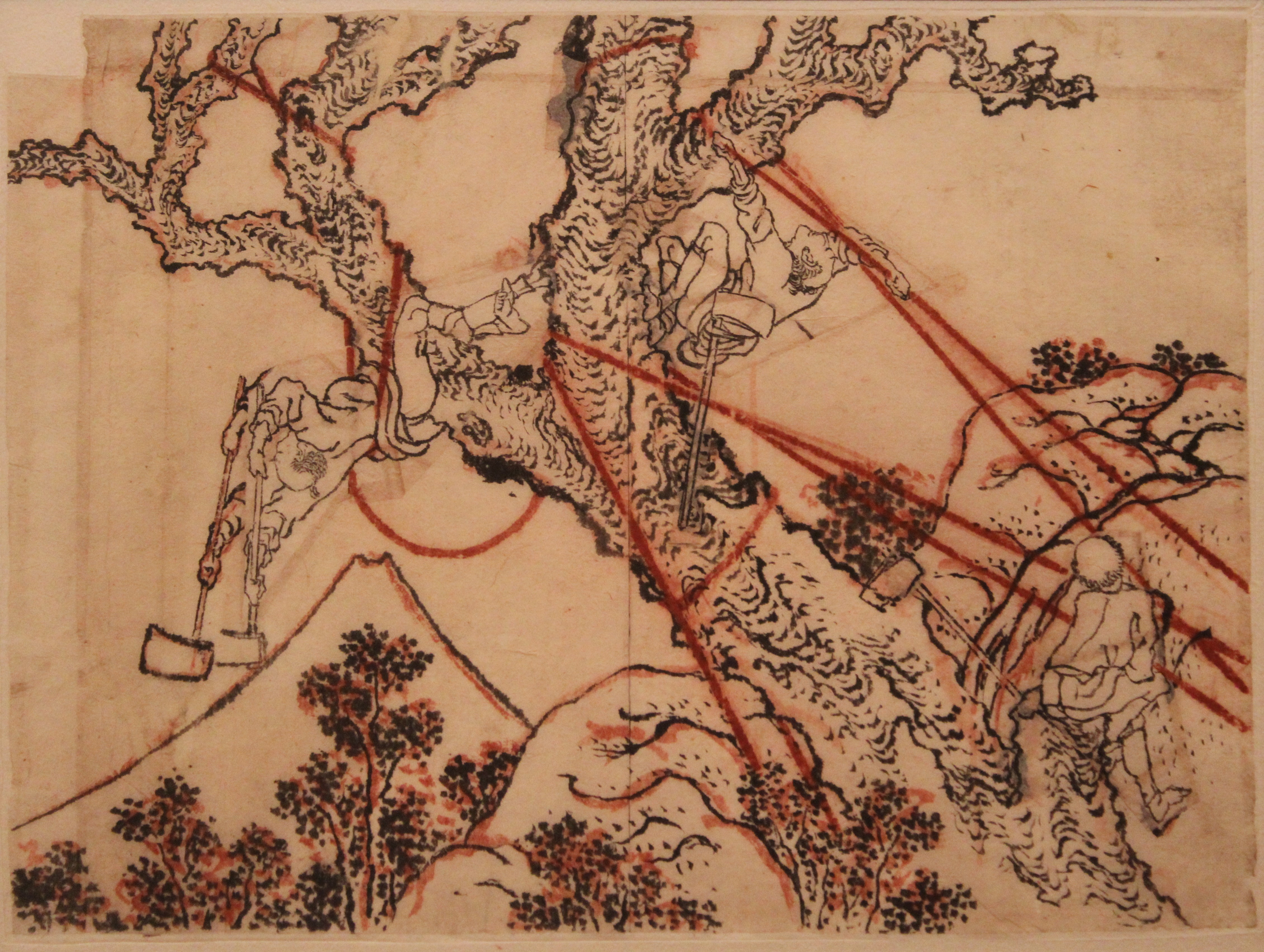
"Fuji in the Totomi Mountains", preparatory drawing in India ink and red pigment on paper

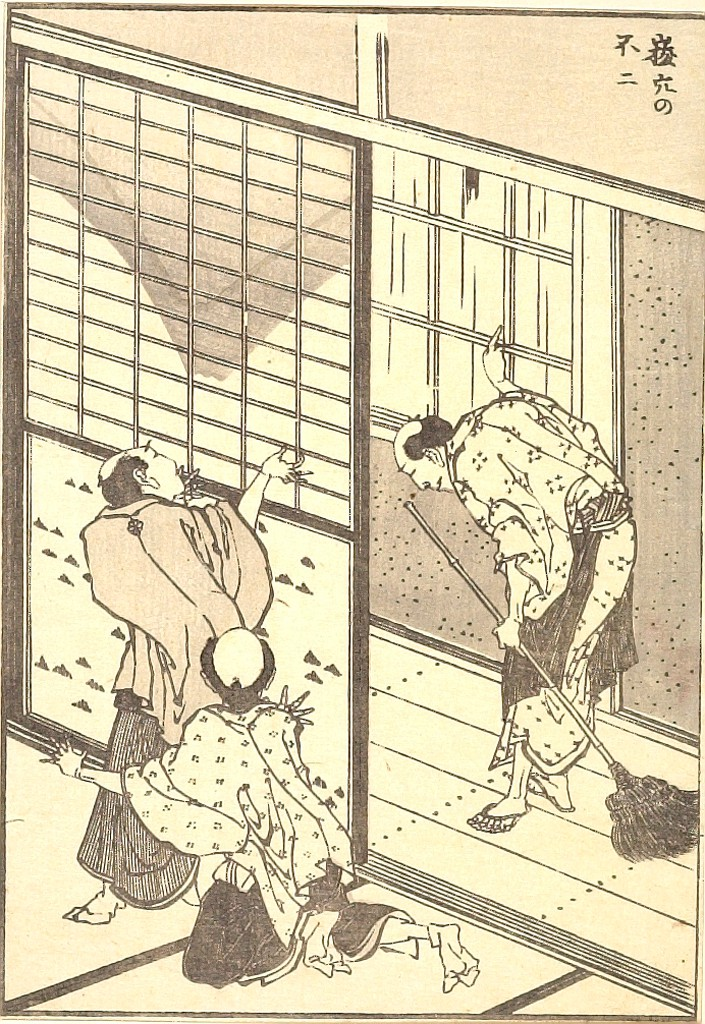
"Fuji through a Knothole"
