= Tsutsui Toshimine =

Japanese ukiyo-e artist and illustrator

Tsutsui Toshimine (筒井 年峰, Tsutsui Toshimine, 1863 or 1865 – c. 1934) was a Japanese ukiyo-e artist and illustrator active in the Meiji period. He is best known for his Kuchi-e (woodblock-printed frontispieces) for literary magazines and books.

== Life ==
Tsutsui Toshimine, whose real name was Tsutsui Yūzō (筒井 勇蔵), was born in Itami in Settsu Province (present-day Hyōgo Prefecture) into a merchant family. There is some uncertainty regarding his birth year: while one source gives Bunkyū 3 (1863), another suggests Keiō 1 (1865).

He moved to Tokyo (Kayabachō) around 1887 for commercial training. From childhood he had a strong inclination toward drawing and painting, frequently sketching in his spare time. Around 1887 (Meiji 20), after visiting an industrial exhibition, he became increasingly devoted to painting, practicing independently in the early mornings and evenings.

He initially attempted to study under Kawanabe Kyōsai, but was refused, as Kyōsai did not accept students indiscriminately. At the age of 25, he instead became a pupil of Tsukioka Yoshitoshi. He also studied under an artist known as Kyokuhō of the Shijō school (四条派). On Yoshitoshi's recommendation, he adopted the art name “Toshimine” by combining one character from each of his teachers’ names.

In the early 1890s (Meiji 24–26), he worked in Osaka producing newspaper illustrations. In 1893 he returned to Tokyo and later joined the newspaper Jiji Shinpō in April 1896, where he worked both as an illustrator and as a photographer. He also produced designs for book and magazine frontispieces.

From 1895 onward, Toshimine became a regular contributor of Kuchi-e illustrations to the literary magazine Bungei Kurabu (文芸倶楽部), remaining active for approximately 18 years, from its early to late phases. He also worked for the editorial office of Shin shōsetsu and created numerous frontispieces for writers associated with the Ken’yūsha group.

Among Kuchi-e artists, he was regarded as one of the leading figures alongside Takeuchi Keishū, Mizuno Toshikata, Tomioka Eisen, Kajita Hanko, Suzuki Kasō, and Ogata Gekkō. His work combined ukiyo-e training with a refined, Western-influenced sensibility, and his strong linework made his prints particularly popular among foreign audiences.

He also produced illustrations for books by authors such as Izumi Kyōka, Iwaya Sazanami, Watanabe Kasatei, Emi Suikage, and Nishimura Tenshū, among others, and gained recognition overseas as a designer of woodblock frontispieces.

Around 1901 (Meiji 34), he began studying photography as part of his artistic research. His name appears among the pupils of Yoshitoshi on the memorial stele to Yoshitoshi erected in 1898 at Mukōjima Hyakkaen, alongside artists such as Mizuno Toshikata and Migita Toshihide.

His death is traditionally dated to around 1934 (Shōwa 9), though this remains unconfirmed.

== Works ==
Tsutsui Toshimine is best known for his Kuchi-e illustrations and book frontispieces.

=== Kuchi-e (selected) ===
- Kyō no neko (京の猫), Bungei Kurabu, vol. 1, no. 13 (1895)
- Kōsan ryokuhai (紅惨緑悲), Bungei Kurabu, vol. 4, no. 7 (1898)
- Takinogawa (瀧の川), Bungei Kurabu, vol. 9, no. 15 (1903)
- Hagi to tsuki (萩と月), Bungei Kurabu, vol. 11, no. 11 (1905)
- Ajisai (あぢさい), Bungei Kurabu, vol. 12, no. 8 (1906)
- Toshi no ichi (年の市), Bungei Kurabu, vol. 13, no. 16 (1907)
- Hana no shita (花の下), Bungei Kurabu, vol. 14, no. 6 (1908)
- Shunsui (春水), Bungei Kurabu, vol. 15, no. 5 (1909)
- Kaerizaki (返り咲き), Bungei Kurabu, vol. 15, no. 14 (1909)
- Tōrō (とうろう), Bungei Kurabu, vol. 16, no. 9 (1910)
- Yamakago (山駕籠), Bungei Kurabu, vol. 17, no. 10 (1911)
- Matsuri no yoru (祭りの夜), Bungei Kurabu, vol. 18, no. 8 (1912)

=== Book illustrations (selected) ===
- Tenmokuzan (天目山), by Nishimura Tenshū (1891)
- Ochimusha (落武者), by Watanabe Kasatei (1893)
- Toyoshima arashi (豊島嵐), by Fukuchi Ōchi (1895)
- Nio no ukisu (鳰の浮巣), by Miyazaki Sanmai (1896)
- Kanmiyazaemon (冠弥左衛門), by Kyōka Izumi (1896)
- Sarudaijin (猿大尽), by Sazanami Iwaya (1896)
- Shin kazoku (新華族), by Sazanami Iwaya (1896)
- Shin kamawanu bō (新かまわぬ坊), by Suiin Emi (1897)

== Bibliography ==
- Iwakiri, Shin’ichirō: Tsutsui Toshimine ni suite (筒井年峰について, On Tsutusi Toshimine), Issun, no. 33 (2008) 10–14.
- Iwakiri, Shin’ichirō: Tsutsui Toshimine (筒井年峰), in: Hangadō (ed.), Kindai Nihon Hangaka Meiran (1900–1945) (近代日本版画家名覧 [1900–1945], A Directory of Modern Japanese Printmakers [1900–1945]), online at Hangadō, retrieved March 30, 2026, 63.
