= Nishimura Yohachi =

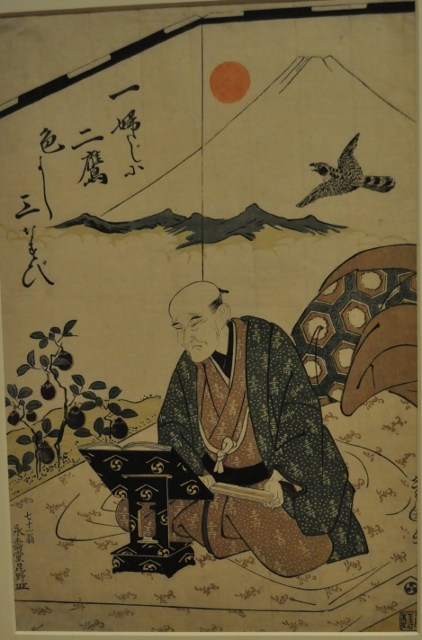
Eijudō Hibino at Seventy-one Portrait by Utagawa Toyokuni I commemorating 71st year of Nishimuraya Yohachi, c. 1799

Nishimuraya Yohachi (dates unknown) was one of the leading publishers of woodblock prints in late 18th-century Japan. He founded the Nishimuraya Yohachi publishing house, also known as Nishiyo (西与), which operated in Nihonbashi's Bakurochō Nichōme under the shop name Eijudō. The firm's exact dates are unclear, but many art historians date its activity to between c. 1751 and 1860.

According to Andreas Marks, Nishimuraya is "one of the most important publishers in the history of prints and may be the publisher with the biggest output over time," attributing his success to "engaging the best artists and providing a broad range of prints to satisfy the public's interest." One of the press' most significant products was Hokusai's famous Thirty-six Views of Mount Fuji, which appeared between c. 1830 and 1833 and the first two volumes of his exquisite 100 Views of Mount Fuji ehon in 1834 and 1835. Nishimuraya Yohachi also published prints by Eishi, Kuniyasu, Toyokuni I and Kunisada, as well as Koryūsai's Hinagata wakana no hatsumoyo (1776–81), an ōban-format series of 140 prints considered the longest bijin-ga series ever produced.

Nishimuraya is immortalized in the 1787 print Eijudō Hibino at Seventy-one by Utagawa Toyokuni I.

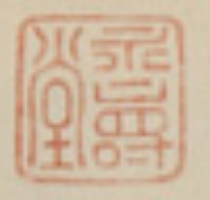
The seal used by the Yohachi shop for the release of Thirty-six Views of Mount Fuji

He is known to have been a member of the Fuji-kō, an Edo period cult centred around Mount Fuji. Founded by an ascetic named Hasegawa Kakugyō (1541–1646), the cult venerated the mountain as a female deity, and encouraged its members to climb it. In doing so they would be reborn, "purified and... able to find happiness." The cult waned in the Meiji period and although it persists to this day it has been subsumed into Shintō sects. The publisher's association with the Fuji-kō gives clues not only to imagery in his portrait by Utagawa, but also to his eagerness to participate in the production of Hokusai's various works celebrating Mount Fuji.

== See also ==
- Ukiyo-e
- Edo period

== Sources ==
- Hillier, Jack; Smith, Lawrence (1980). Japanese Prints: 300 Years of Albums and Books. British Museum Press. ISBN 978-0714114187.
- Machotka, Ewa. Visual Genesis of Japanese National Identity: Hokusai's Hyakunin Isshu. Brussels: Peter Lang, 2009.
- Marks, Andreas. Japanese Woodblock Prints: Artists, Publishers and Masterworks 1680-1900. Tokyo: Tuttle, 2010.
- Melton, J. Gordon. Encyclopedia of Religious Phenomena. Canton, MI: Visible Ink Press, 2008
- Newland, Amy Reigle. Ed. Hotei Encyclopedia of Woodblock Prints, vol. 2., 2003.
- Volker, T. Ukiyoe Quartet: publisher, designer, engraver and printer. Mededelingen van het Rijksmuseum voor Volkenkunde, Issue 5, Volume 129. Leiden: E. J. Brill, 1949.
- Japanese Prints. Nishimuraya Yohachi. Cowell-Thackray Collection of Japanese woodblock prints and works on paper. Accessed October 27, 2013.
- Honolulu Museum of Art. Portrait of Publisher Nishimuraya Yohachi I on His Seventy-first Birthday. Accessed October 28, 2013.
