= Chigusa Kitani =

Japanese artist (1895–1947)

Chigusa Kitani (木谷 千種, Kitani Chigusa)
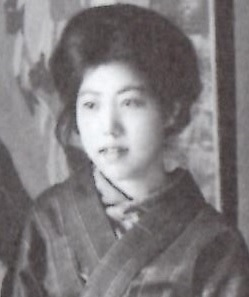
- Born: Ei Yoshioka (吉岡 英, Yoshioka Ei); February 17, 1895; Kita-ku, Osaka, Osaka Prefecture
- Died: January 24, 1947 (aged 51); Minamikawachi District, Osaka
- Education: Shimizudani Girls' High School
- Known for: Painting
- Style: Bijin-ga (美人画; "beautiful person picture")
- Movement: Nihonga (日本画)

Chigusa Kitani (木谷 千種, Kitani Chigusa; February 17, 1895 - January 24, 1947) was a Japanese Nihonga (日本画) painter and painting teacher in Taishō and Shōwa Japan.

== Life ==
Born Chigusa Kitani at Kita-ku, Osaka Dōjima (ja:堂島), the center of the Osaka (the second largest metropolitan area in Japan), in 1895 under the name Ei Yoshioka (吉岡 英, Yoshioka Ei). While studying at Shimizudani Girls' High School, She studied Bird-and-flower painting under Chokujō Fukada (ja:深田直城, Fukada Chokujō) who is a famous painter of the Shijō school (四条派, Shijō-ha). She moved to Tokyo in 1913 (Taishō 2) to study under Shōen Ikeda (ja:池田蕉園, Ikeda Shōen).

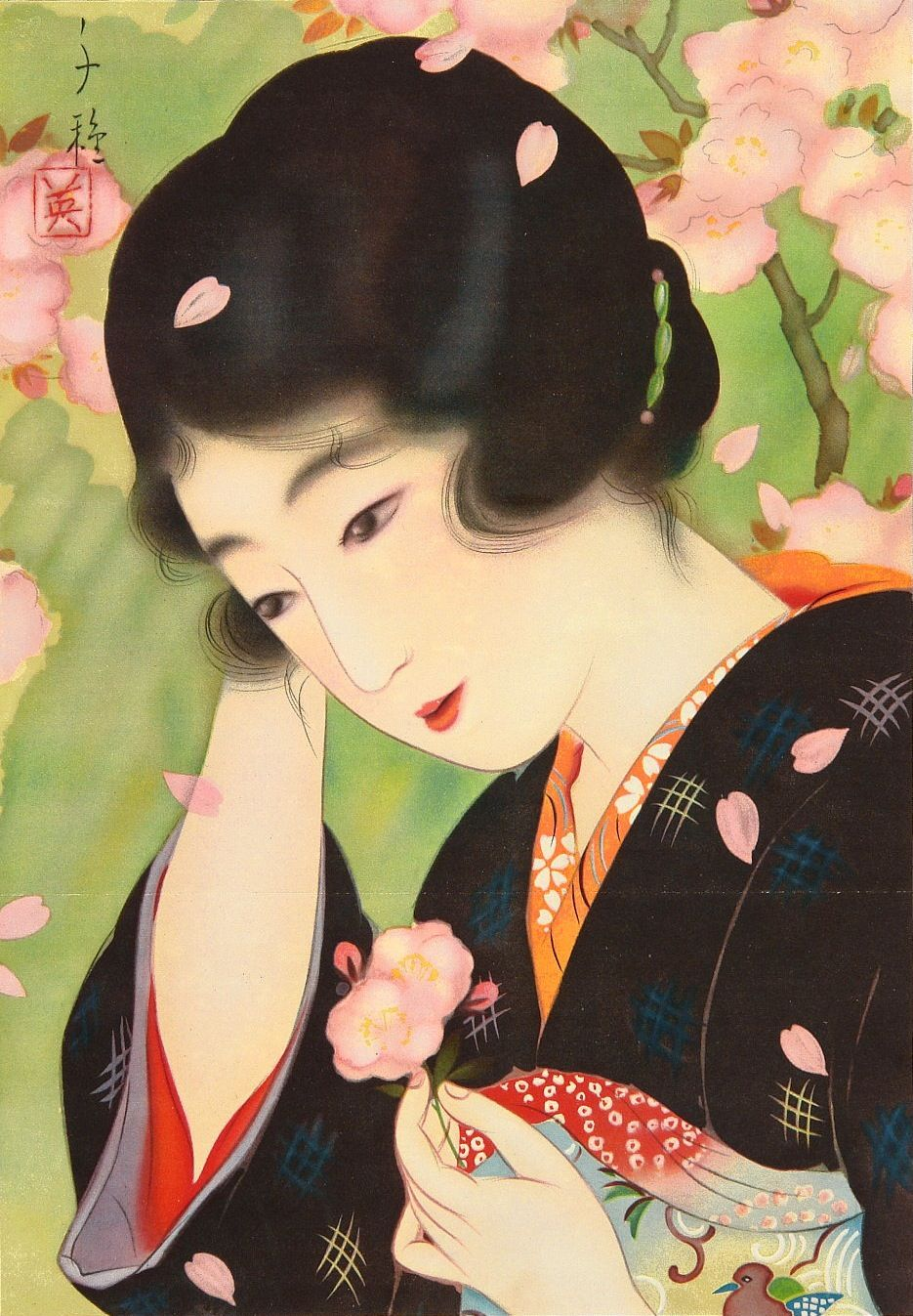
Kuchi-e (口絵, frontispieces of books) - Lithography

After returning to Osaka, She became a pupil of Tsunetomi Kitano (ja:北野恒富, Kitano Tsunetomi) and Kyuho Noda (ja:野田九浦, Noda Kyuho). Kitano is famous painter who draws (Bijin-ga (美人画; "beautiful person picture", is a generic term for pictures of beautiful women in Japanese art) . In 1919, She started studying under Keigetsu Kikuchi (ja:菊池契月, Kikuchi Keigetsu) in Kyoto.

She trained in Seattle, Washington, in the United States for two years from the age of 13, and her work was exhibited throughout Japan. In 1920, she married Hōgin Kitani (ja:木谷蓬吟, Kitani Hōgin), a researcher on Chikamatsu Monzaemon (dramatist of jōruri). In the same year, she established a painting school Yachigusa-kai (八千草会) and Chigusa-kai (千種会) at her home in Osaka. She aimed to nurture, instruct and improve the status of female painters.

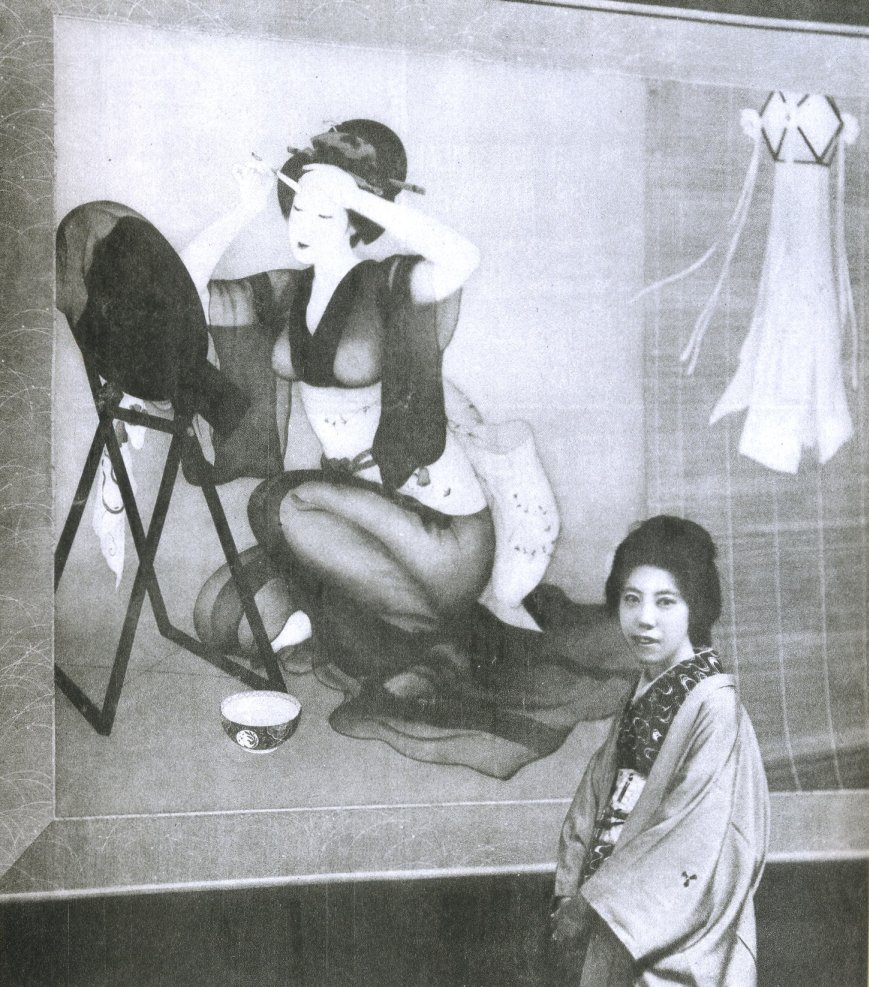
With her painting Mayu no Nagori (眉の名残, Care for and Remnants the eyebrows)

She died in 1947 (Shōwa 22) in the Minamikawachi of Osaka at the age of 51.

== Works ==
In 1915, Chigusa Kitani, at the age of 20, was selected for the first Osaka Fine Arts Exhibition (大阪美術展覧会, Osaka Bijutu Tenrankai) as Shin-kyo (新居, "New house") and for the 9th Ministry of Education Art Fine Arts Exhibition (文部省美術展覧会 (文展, Bunten), Monbu-Sho Bijutu Tenrankai) as Hari-Kuyō (針供養, "Memorial ceremony Festival of Broken Needles").This Hari-Kuyō is a work depicting a Geisha girl in Kyoto.

She showed her works at the exhibitions such as Imperial Fine Arts Academy Exhibition (帝国美術院展覧会 (帝展, Teiten), Teikoku Bijutu-in Tenrankai), Kikuchijuku-ten (菊池塾展, "Exhibition for private school by Keigetsu Kikuchi") and Yachigusakai-ten (Yachigusakai's Exhibition).

=== Gallery ===
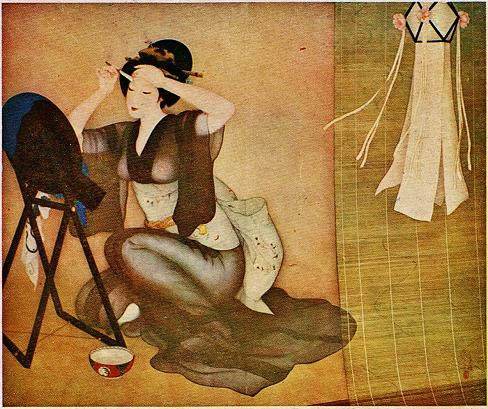
Mayu no Nagori (眉の名残, Care for and Remnants the eyebrows; 1925)

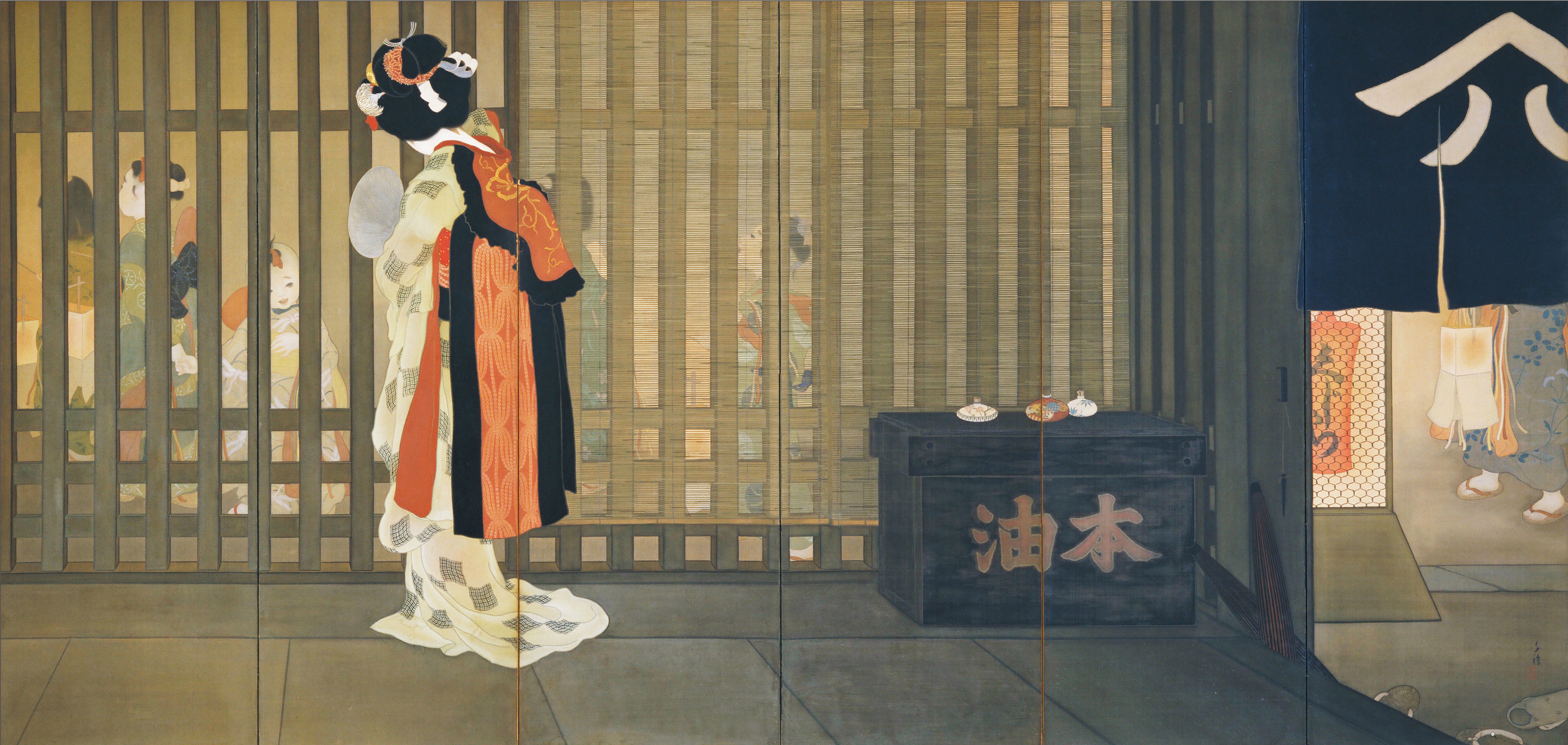
Ongoku (をんごく, Distant country; 1918)

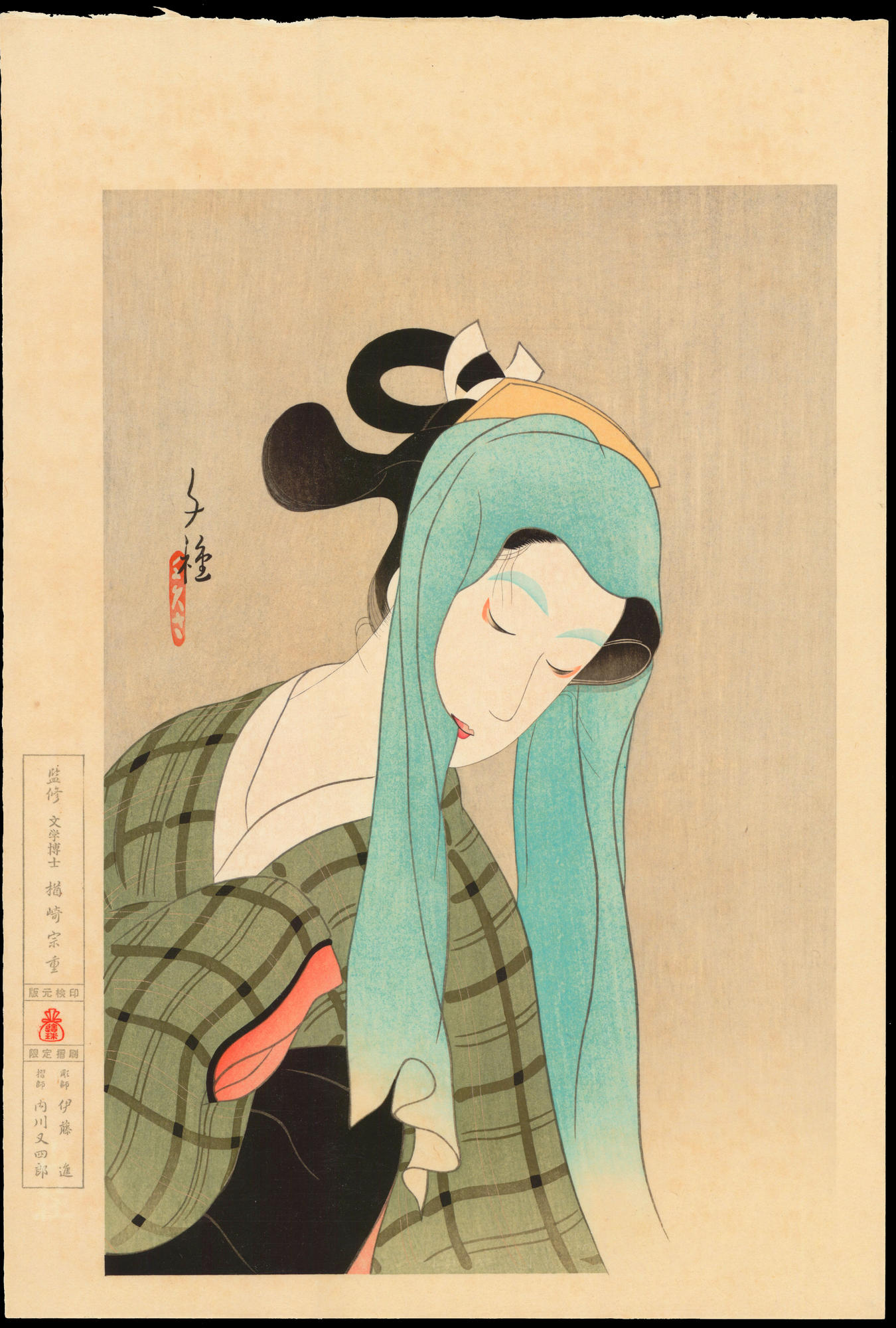
Shinju Yoi Goshin no Ochiyo (心中宵庚申、お千代, Ochiyo at "double love suicide"; 1922) Woodcut from "Complete works of Chikamatsu Monzaemon" by Hōgin Kitani

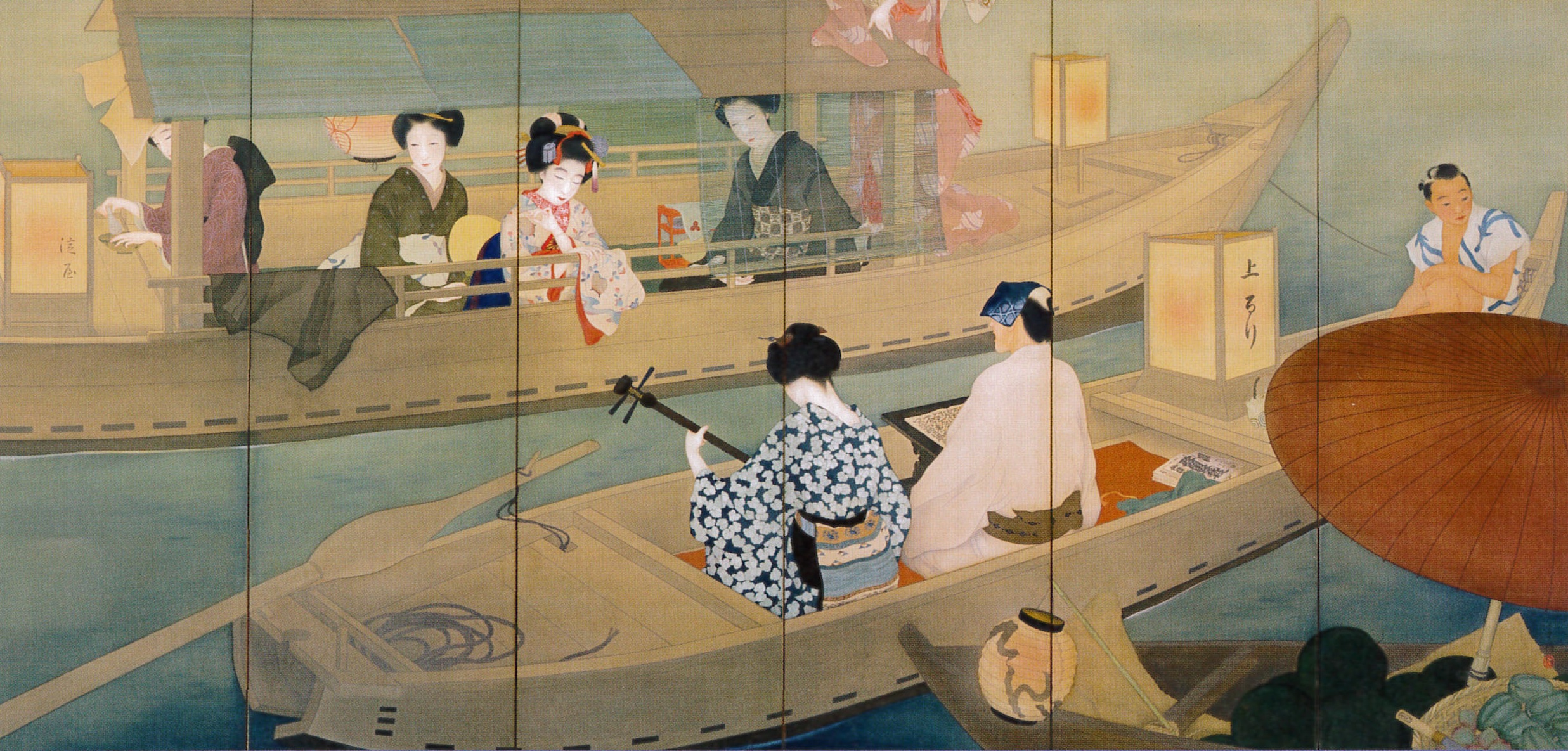
Jōruri Bune (浄瑠璃船, Small boat for playing Jōruri music; 1926)

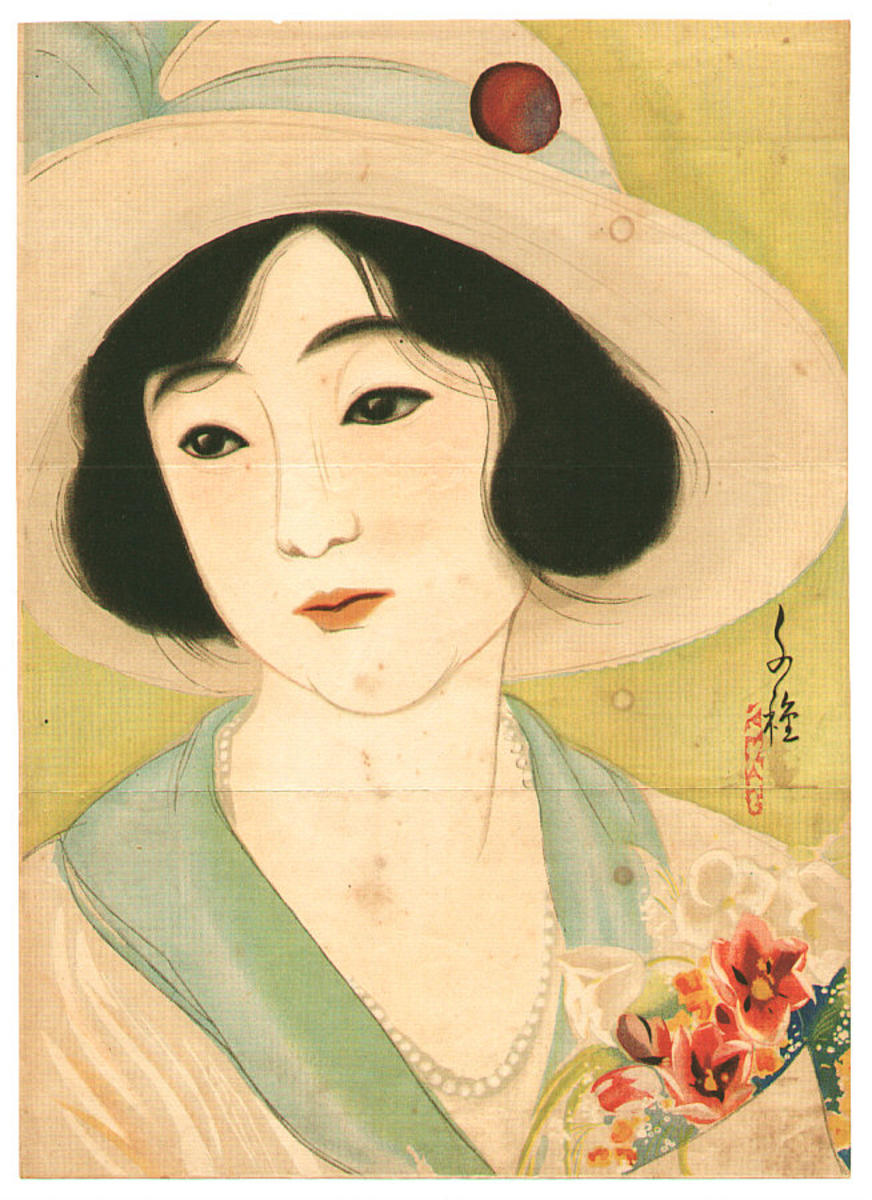
Kuchi-e (口絵, frontispieces of books) - Lithography

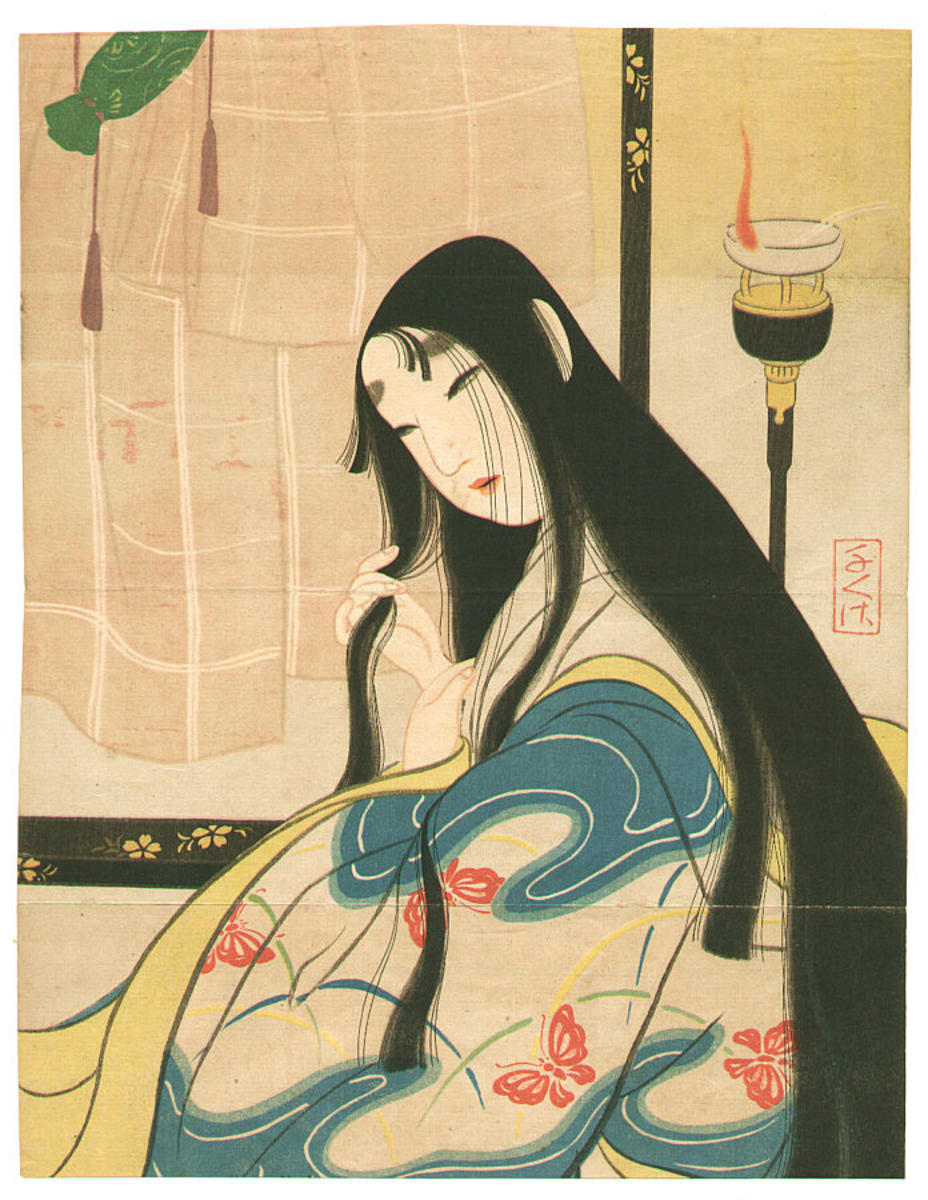
Kuchi-e (Lithography)

== See also ==
- Bijin-ga (美人画; "beautiful person picture")
- Shin-hanga (新版画; lit. "new prints", "new woodcut (block) prints") was an art movement in early 20th-century Japan
- Shima Seien
- List of Cultural Properties of Japan - paintings (Ōsaka)

== Sources ==
- KITANI (YOSHIOKA) Chigusa«Ongoku»｜Our Collection｜Artrip Museum : Nakanoshima Museum of Art, Osaka - Osaka City Museum Of Modern Art. Retrieved 2020-04-18.
