= Nise Murasaki Inaka Genji =

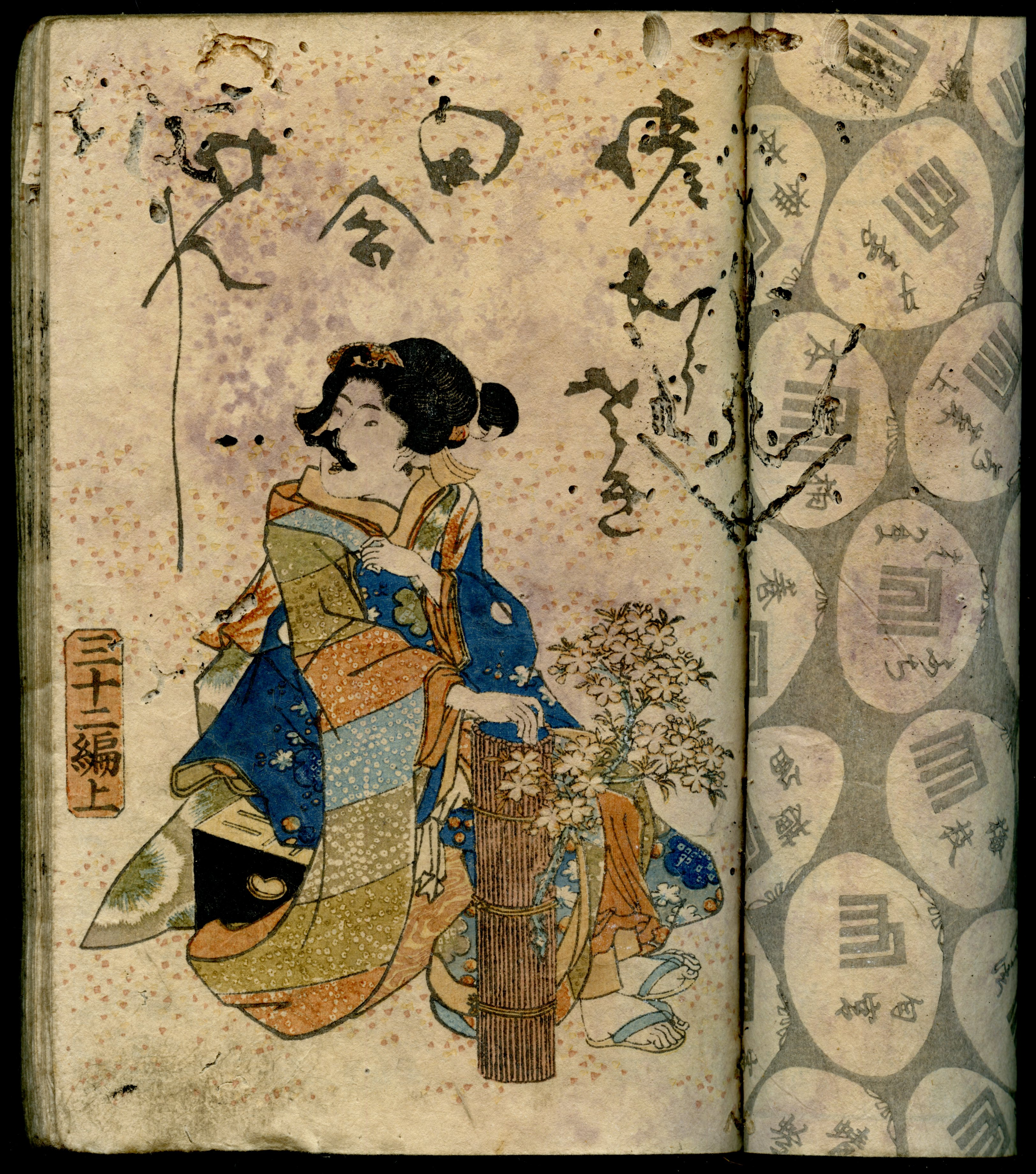
Rustic Genji by a Fake Murasaki, text by Ryūtei Tanehiko with illustrations by Utagawa Kunisada

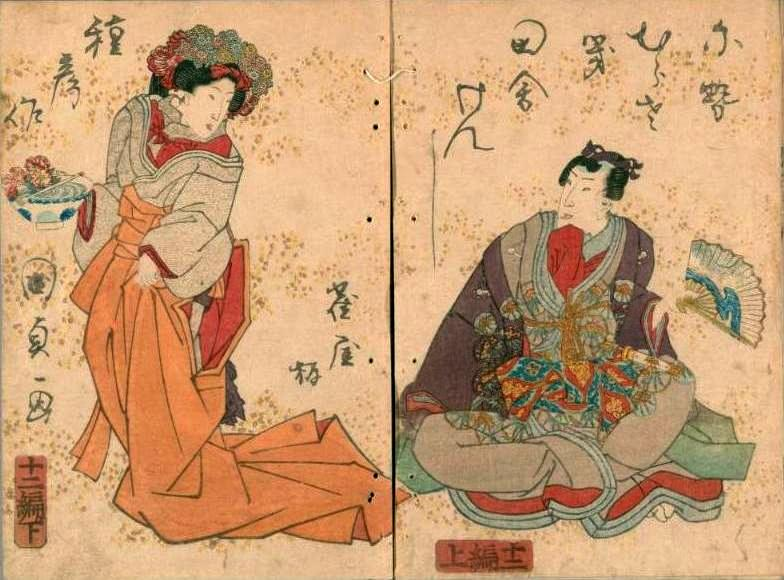
Each volume has Part1's book and Part2's. The front covers of the two books show one picture.

Nise Murasaki inaka Genji (偐紫田舎源氏), translated variously as The Rustic Genji, False Murasaki and a Country Genji, or A Fraudulent Murasaki's Bumpkin Genji, is a late-Edo period Japanese literary parody of the Tale of Genji by Murasaki Shikibu. The work, by Ryūtei Tanehiko (柳亭種彦) (1783–1842) with illustrations by Utagawa Kunisada, was published in a woodblock edition between 1829 and 1842 by Senkakudō.

The parody shifts the time-frame from the Heian period to the Muromachi period, and replaces inserted waka poetry with haiku.

It was the best-selling example of the genre known as gōkan (合巻), a popular literary form that merged image with text. The plot centres on the outlandish adventures of Ashikaga Mitsuuji, second son of Ashikaga Yoshimasa, while seeking to recover a stolen sword, mirror, and poem, upon which the security of the realm depend. The preface to the first chapter introduces the character Ōfuji, whose nickname is Murasaki Shikibu. In the preface to the tenth chapter, Tanehiko describes his own literary project:

When I first began to write The Rustic Genji an aged friend said to me: "You should try to the best of your ability to preserve the language of the original and not alter the story. It will probably then be of some use to young people who haven't read The Tale of Genji." But a young friend said, "You should vary the plot. Weave in effects from Kabuki and the puppet theatre. Surely there can't be anyone who hasn't read Genji."

== See also ==
- The Dog Pillow
- E-hon
- Imperial Regalia of Japan
