= Soga Chokuan =

Japanese painter

Soga Chokuan (Japanese: 曽我 直庵) (fl. late 16th–early 17th c.) was a Japanese painter recognized for his bird-and-flower paintings.

Within the bird-and-flower idiom, Soga excelled at painting landfowl, such as roosters: With careful brushwork and rich tones, he gave them an attitude of fierce dignity. He worked rapidly, as this was the fashion in ink wash painting at the time. He was celebrated for his depictions of falconry and was commissioned by prominent samurai to paint either individual or sets of tethered hawk images for folding screens.

Although several of his works are extant, the details of his life are mostly undocumented. He was born in the late 16th century, and is believed to have died sometime during or after the Keichō period.

Soga had a son, Nichokuan (literally, Chokuan II). Nichokuan continued the Soga school, and is known for his impressive renderings of hawks.
