= Kuchi-e =

Japanese woodblock prints

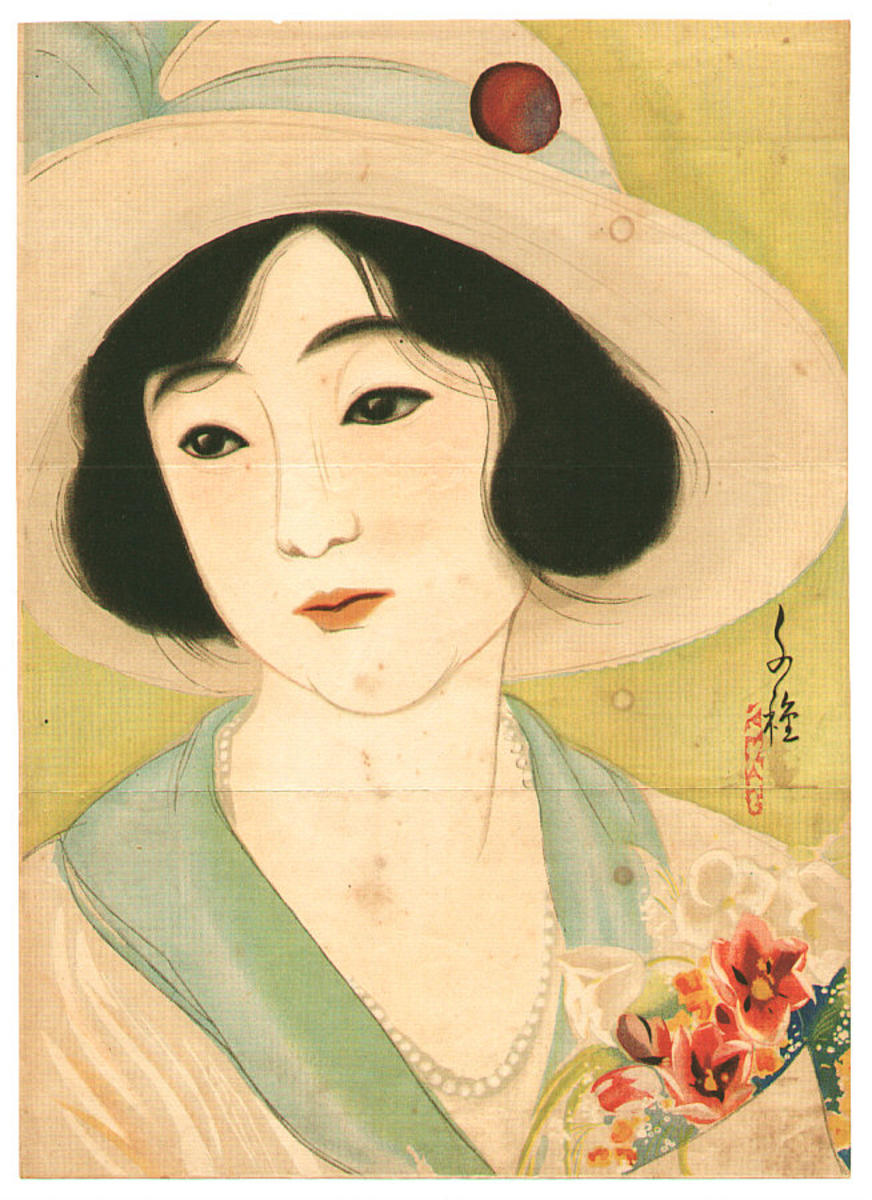
A kuchi-e lithograph by Kitani Chigusa. Note the creases where the print was folded into a magazine.

Kuchi-e (口絵) (lit. 'mouth pictures') are frontispieces of books, especially woodblock printed frontispieces for Japanese romance novels and literary magazines published from the 1890s to the 1910s.

They usually portrayed women and were bound to the book's spine or inserted into literary magazines to give readers a sense of what type of stories were to unfold. Most kuchi-e were woodblock prints in romance novels intended for a female audience. Some were lithographs, and some were inserted into other types of literature. The first mass-produced publication to regularly feature kuchi-e designs popular literary magazine Bungei Kurabu, with over 230 individual inserted from 1895 to 1914. Most measured either 22 cm × 30 cm (8.7 in × 11.8 in) or 14 cm × 20 cm (5.5 in × 7.9 in), the former being folded in thirds, and the latter being folded in half.

The general standard of kuchi-e prints is remarkably high. Made at a time of well developed woodblock printing techniques, it is thought the addition of these prints contributed to almost half the cost of production. Still, the genre is under-appreciated as an artfrom by the majority of print collectors. The standard text on the subject is Merritt and Yamada's Woodblock Kuchi-e Prints—Reflections of Meiji Culture (2000).

== Practitioners ==
Artists who designed kuchi-e include Hirezaki Eiho, Ikeda Shoen, Kaburagi Kiyokata, Kajita Hanko, Mishima Shoso, Mizuno Toshikata, Odake Kokkan, Ogata Gekko, Suzuki Kason, Takeuchi Keishu, Terasaki Kogyo, Tomioka Eisen, Tsutsui Toshimine, Utagawa Kunimatsu, Watanabe Seitei, and Yamada Keichu.

== Translation ==
The word kuchi-e (口絵) is usually translated into English as mouth (kuchi) picture (e). However, kuchi (口) may also mean "opening", as it does in the compound words iri-guchi (入口, entrance) and de-guchi (出口, exit). In this way, the translation "entrance picture" more clearly communicates the intended function of a kuchi-e as a frontispiece in a literary work.

== Gallery ==
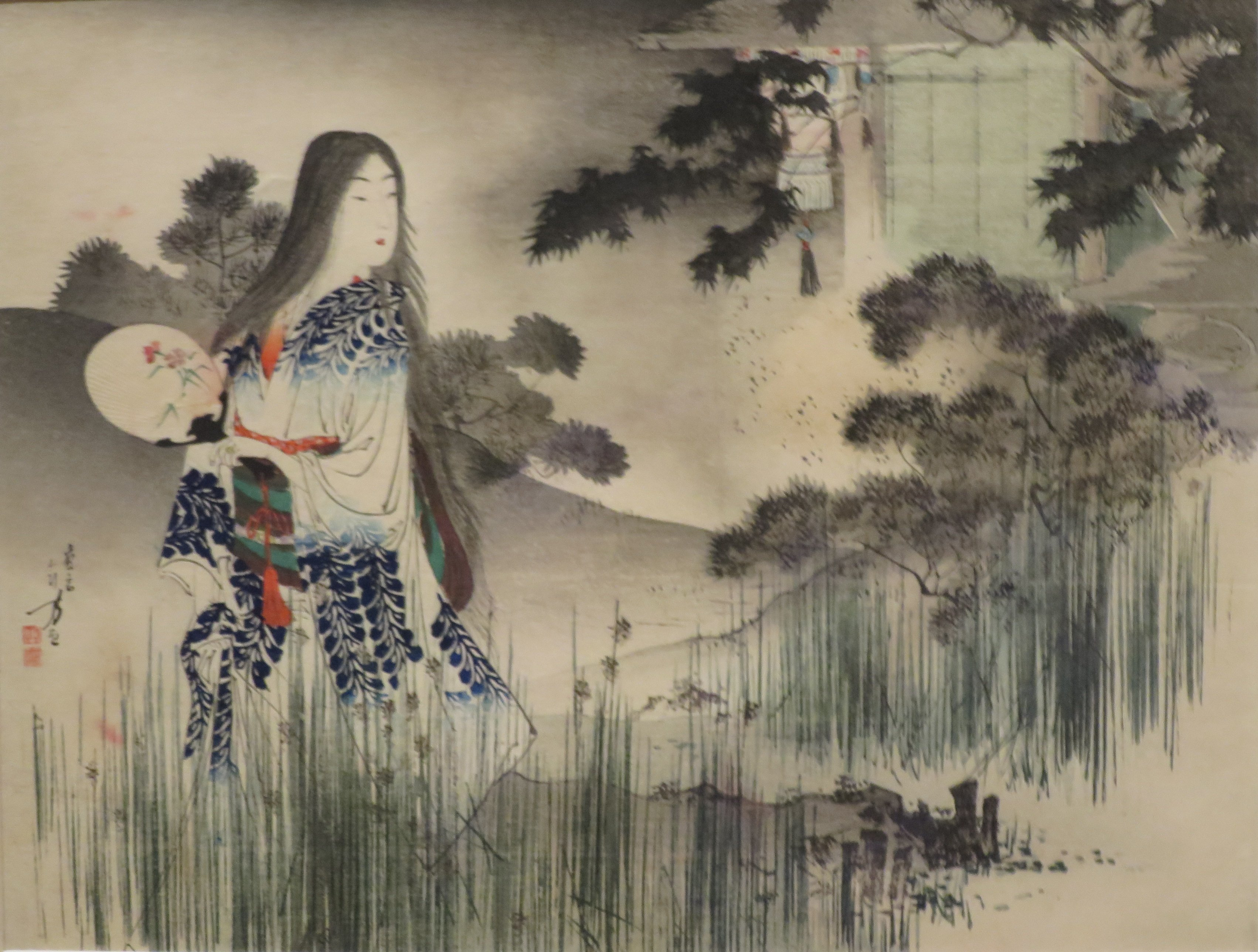
"Lady in Wisteria Kimono", Mizuno Toshikata, c. 1900, Honolulu Museum of Art

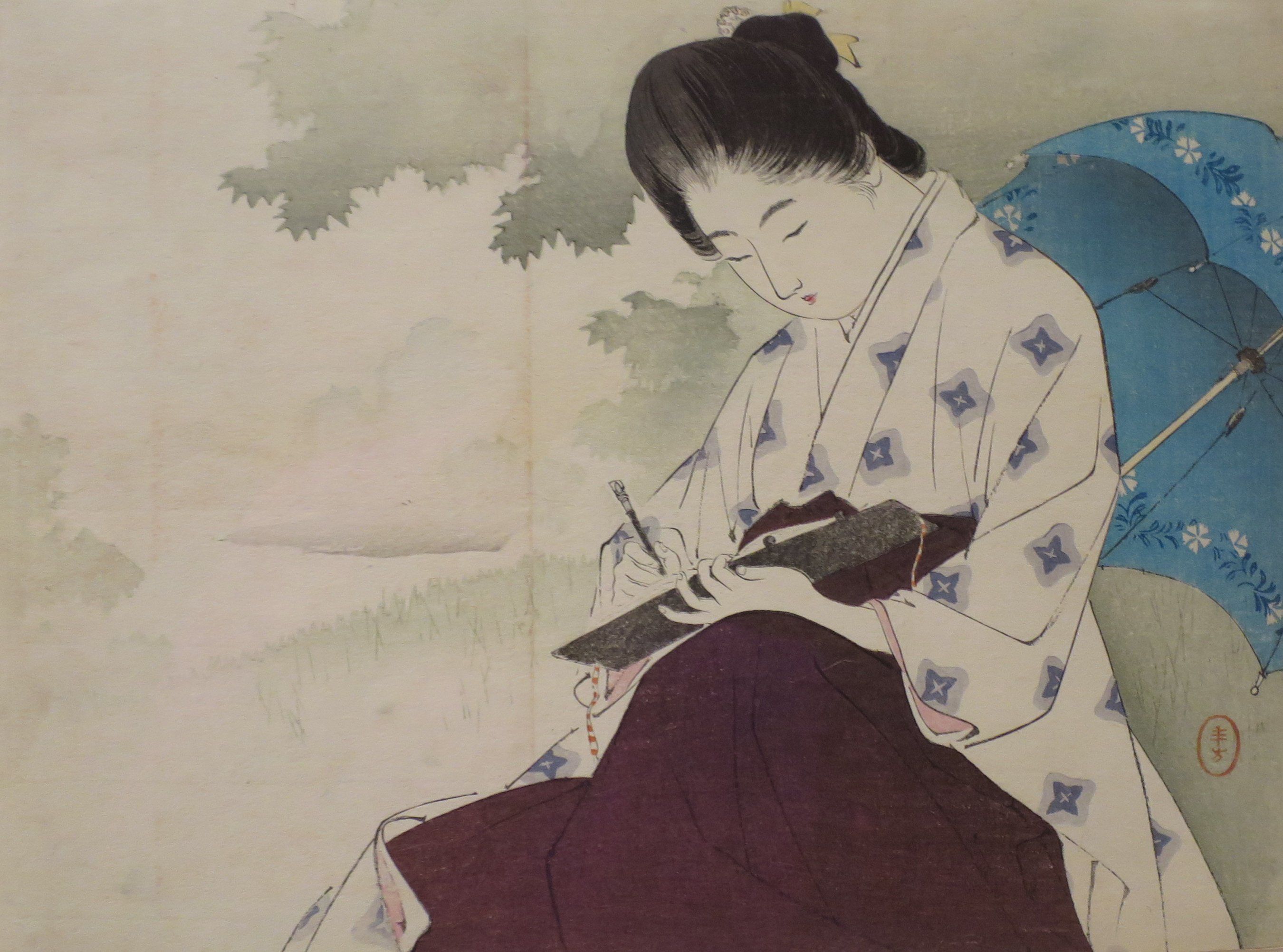
"Beauty Sketching in a Field", Mizuno Toshikata, 1903, Honolulu Museum of Art

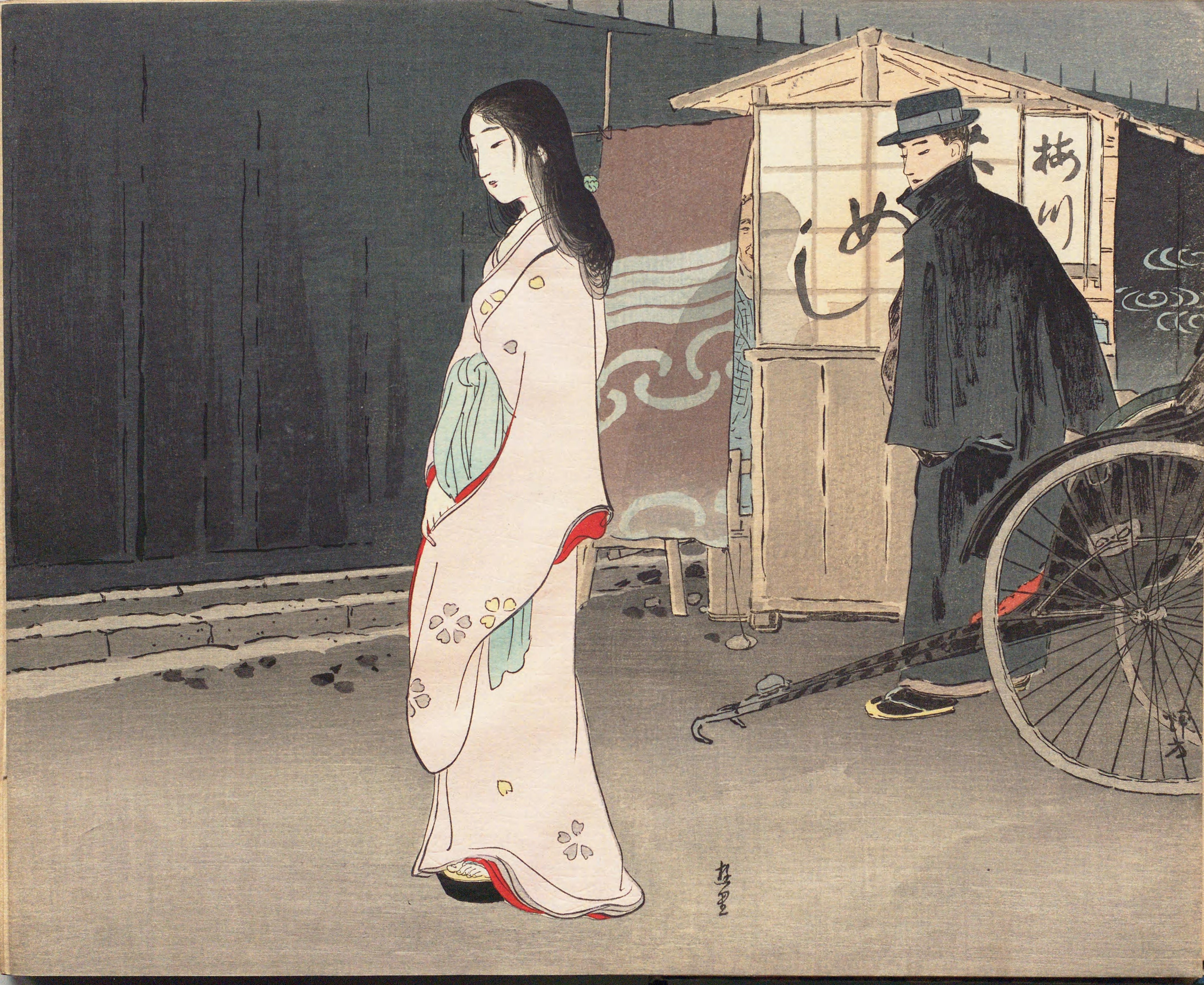
Woodblock kuchi-e for Ai ai gasa by Ikeda Terukata and Shōen, 1914

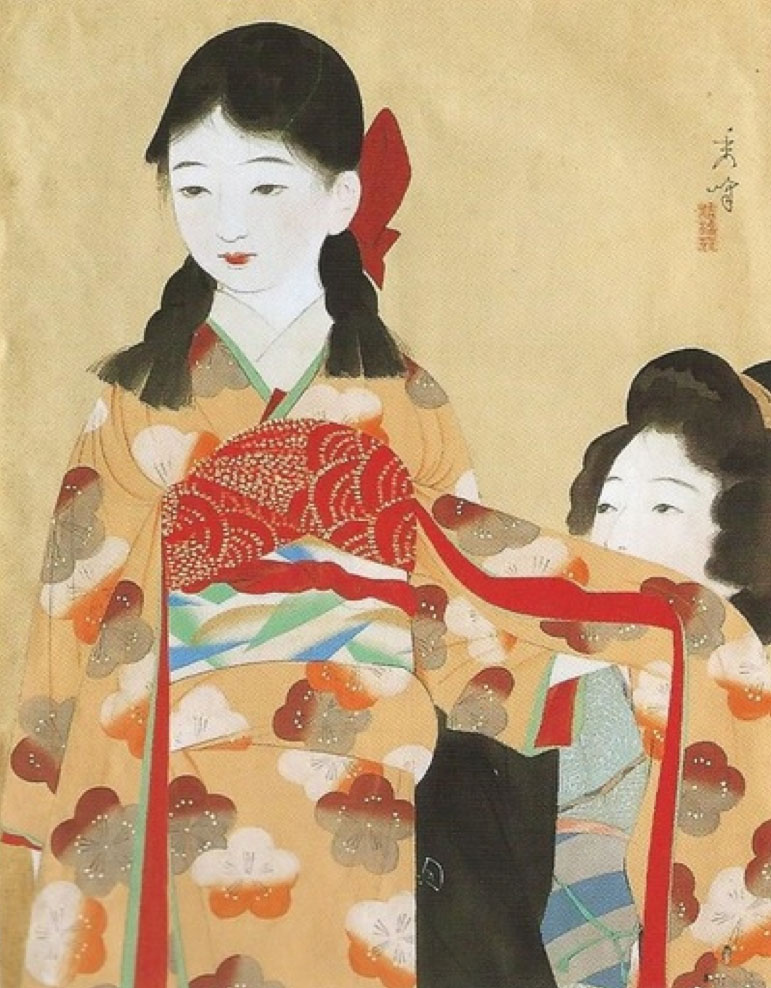
"A Mother's Love", Yamakawa Shūhō 1924

== Sources ==
- Newland, Amy Reigle. (2005). Hotei Encyclopedia of Japanese Woodblock Prints. Amsterdam: Hotei
- Merritt, Helen and Yamada Nanako, Woodblock Kuchi-e Prints--Reflections of Meiji Culture, University of Hawaii Press, Honolulu, 2000, ISBN 0824820738
- Nanako, Yamada, "Beauties as Frontispieces" in Daruma Magazine, Issue 32, Vol. 8, No. 4, pp. 40–48, 2001
