= Shima Seien =

Japanese artist (1892–1970)

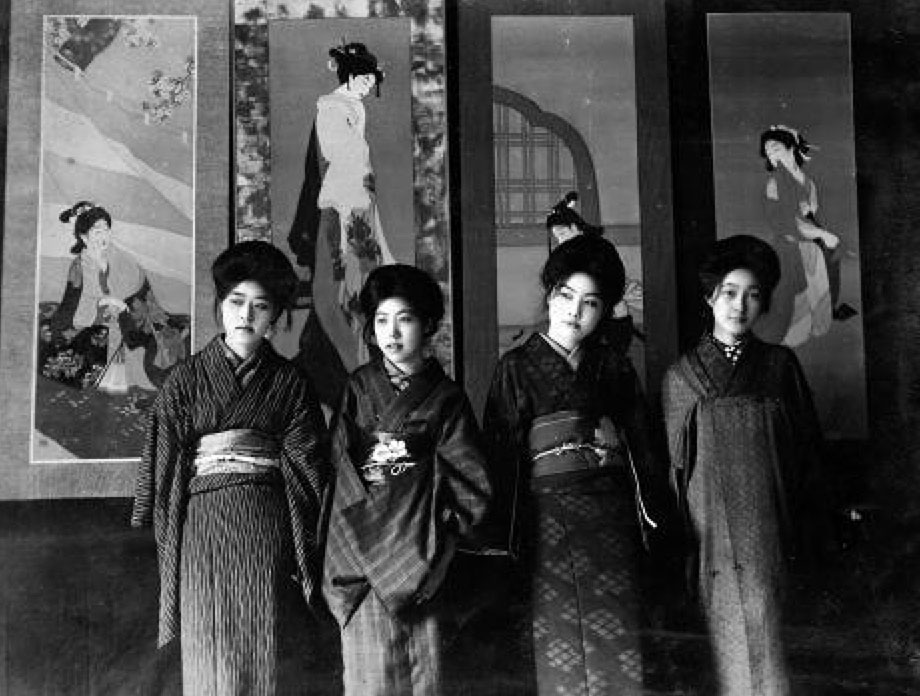
- Shima Seien (third from left) with Okamoto Kōen, Kitani Chigusa, and Matsumoto Kayō in May 1916
- Born: 1892
- Died: 5 March 1970 (aged 77–78)
- Known for: Painting
- Movement: Nihonga

Shima Seien (島成園) (1892–1970) was a nihonga artist in Taishō and Shōwa Japan.

== Life ==
Born Shima Seiei (島成栄) in Sakai in 1892, around the age of 13 she moved with her family to Shimanouchi (島之内) in Osaka. She taught herself how to paint while assisting her brother with his work in design, going on to study with Kitano Tsunetomi (北野恒富) and Noda Kyūho (野田九浦). Married in 1921, she moved to Manchuria in 1927, returning to Japan at the end of the war.

== Works ==
Shima Seien was awarded certificates of commendation for Evening in Soemon-chō (宗右衛門町の夕) at the sixth Bunten exhibition in 1912, Festival Attire (祭りのよそほひ) at the seventh Bunten, and Artlessness (稽古のひま) at the ninth Bunten. Her 1918 self-portrait Untitled (無題) features a facial bruise which she wrote symbolizes the many abuses routinely inflicted upon women by men and the backdrop of an unfinished painting. It is one of three of her works designated as Municipal Cultural Properties of Osaka. This work and two others by the artist, Blackened Teeth (1920) and Woman (Passion of Black Hair) (1917) were shown in Tokyo in 2021 as part of an exhibition at the National Museum of Modern Art, Tokyo titled “Ayashii: Decadent and Grotesque Images of Beauty in Modern Japanese Art.”

== See also ==
- List of Cultural Properties of Japan - paintings (Ōsaka)
- Uemura Shōen
- Yamashita Rin
