= Hokusai Manga =

Series of sketches by Hokusai

Manga (15 volume series)
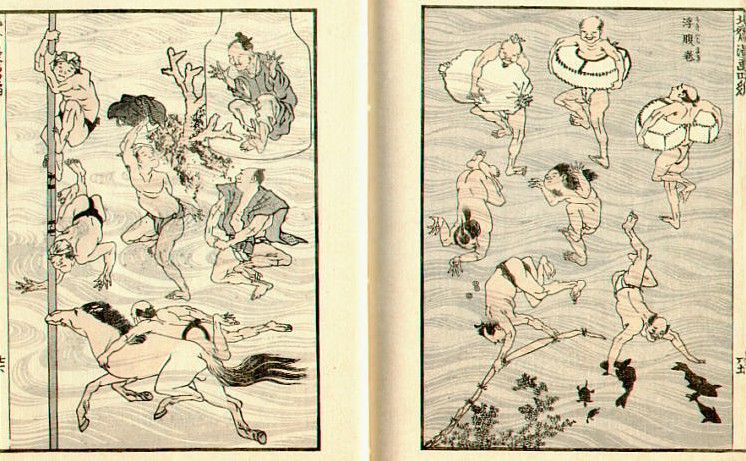
- Artist: Hokusai
- Year: Published 1814–1878
- Type: Wood block prints

The Hokusai Manga (北斎漫画; "Hokusai's Sketches") is a collection of sketches of various subjects by the Japanese artist Hokusai. Subjects of the sketches include landscapes, flora and fauna, everyday life, and the supernatural.

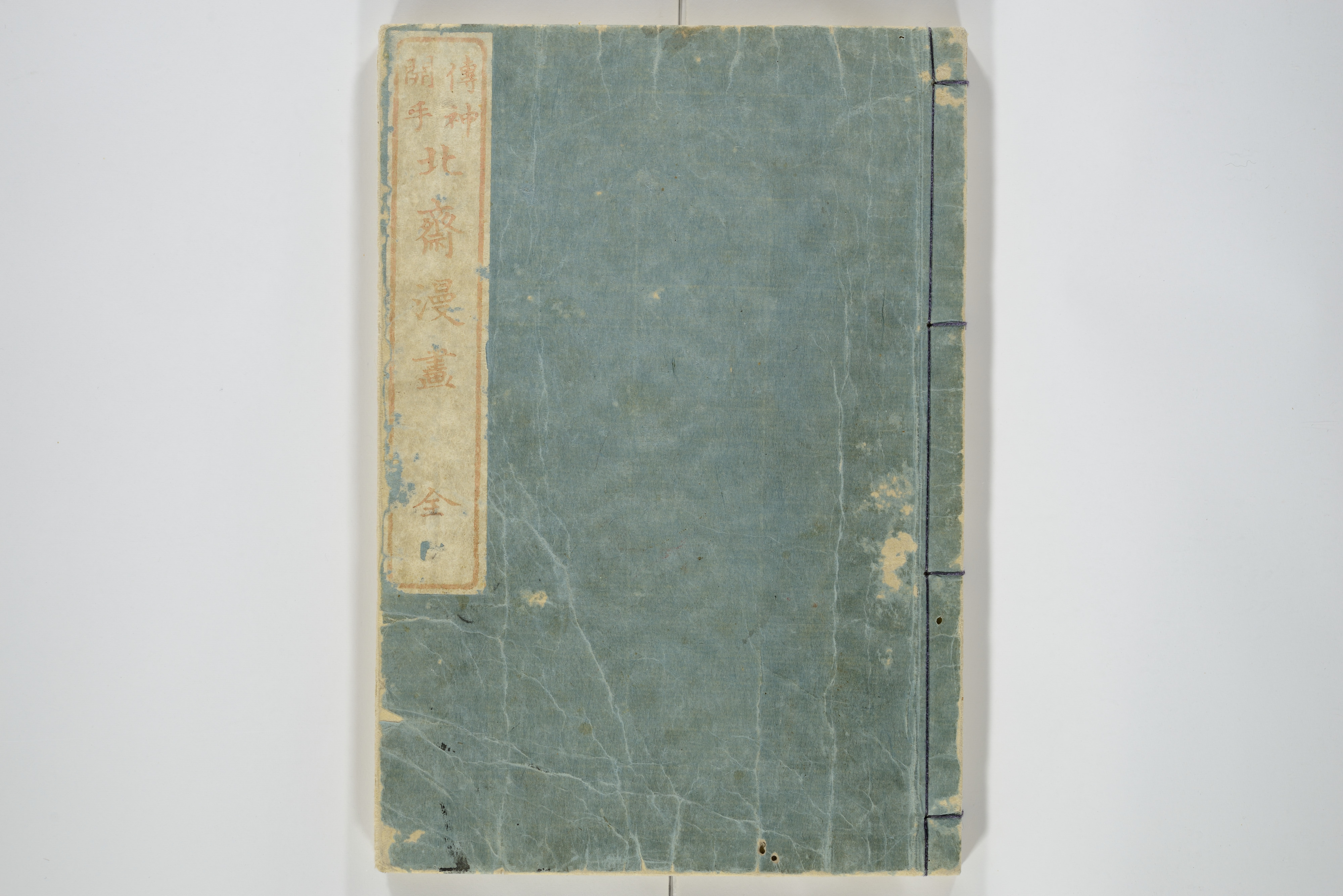
First printed book's Front cover (Metropolitan Museum of Art,Purchase, Mary and James G. Wallach Foundation Gift, 2013)

The word manga in the title does not refer to the contemporary story-telling manga, as the sketches in the work are not connected to each other. While manga has come to mean "comics" in modern Japanese, the word was used in the Edo period to mean informal drawings, possibly preparatory sketches for paintings.

Block-printed in three colours (black, gray and pale flesh), the Hokusai Manga comprises thousands of images in ten volumes from 1814 to 1819, with five volumes added in 1834 to 1878. The first volume was published in 1814, when the artist was 55.

The final three volumes were published posthumously, two of them assembled by their publisher from previously unpublished material. The final volume was made up of previously published works, some not even by Hokusai, and is not considered authentic by art historians.

== Publication history ==
The preface to the first volume of the work, written by Hanshū Sanjin (半洲散人), a minor artist of Nagoya, suggests that the publication of the work may have been aided by Hokusai's pupils. Part of the preface reads:

This autumn the master [Hokusai] happened to visit the Western Province and stopped over at our city [Nagoya]. We all met together with the painter Gekkōtei Bokusen (月光亭墨僊) [Utamasa II, well-known Nagoya artist, pupil of Hokusai's, and collator of Hokusai's later work] at the latter's residence, it being a very joyous occasion. And there over three hundred sketches of all kinds were made – from immortals, Buddhas, scholars, and women on down to birds, beasts, grasses, and trees, the spirit of each captured fully by the brush.

The final volume is considered spurious by some art historians.

The initial publication is usually credited to Eirakuya Toshiro (永楽屋東四郎) of Nagoya whose publishing house was renamed to Eito Shoten in 1914.

== Sources of the Manga ==
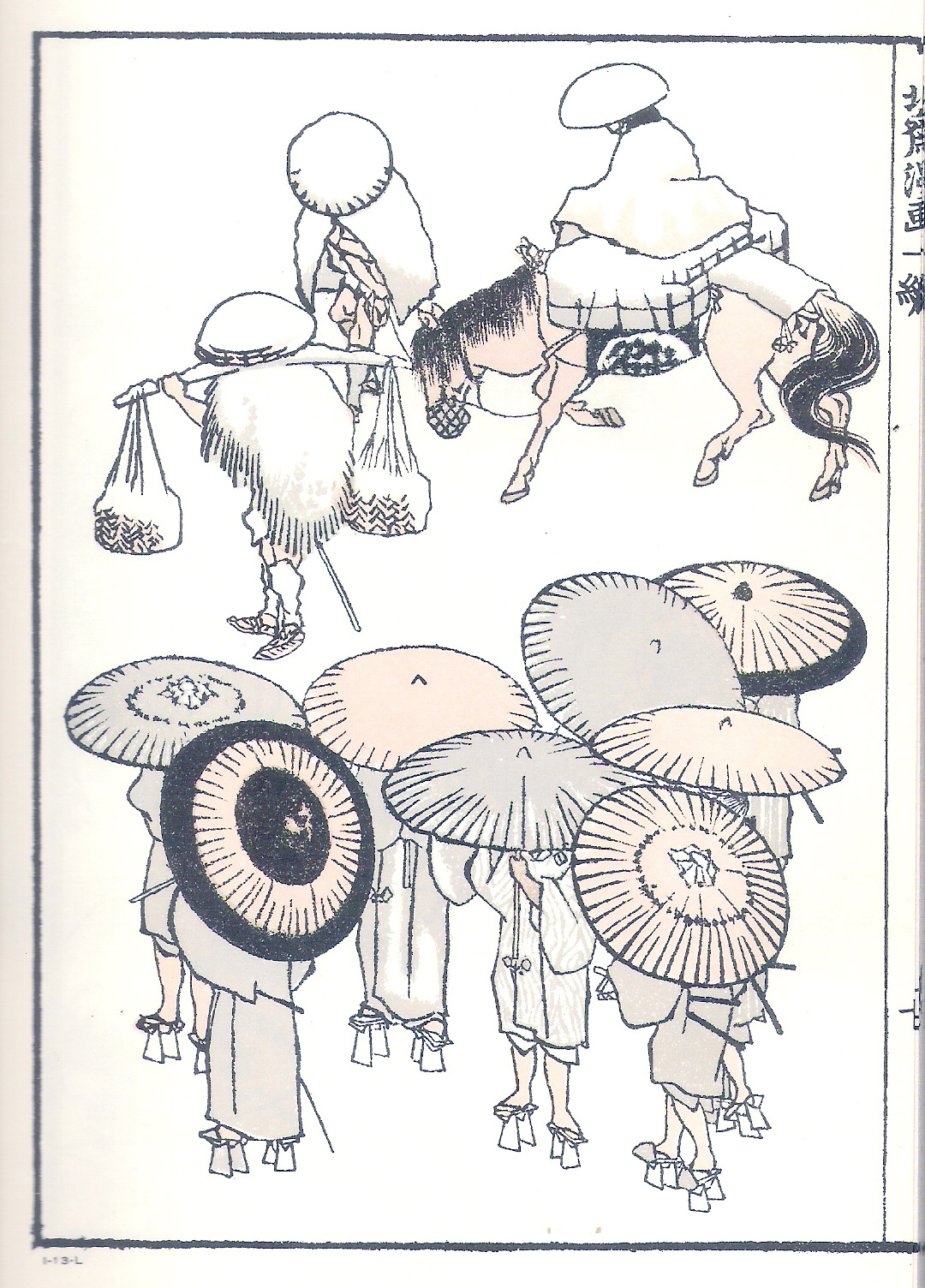
A page from the Manga, showing people with their faces hidden

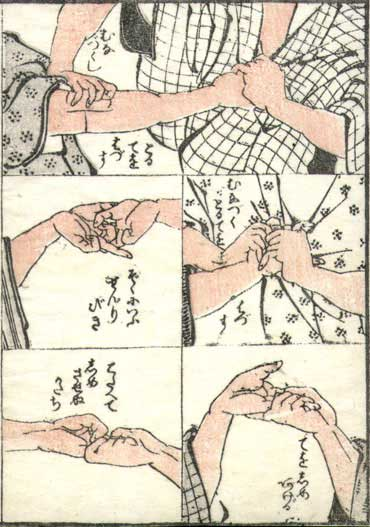
Hokusai Manga depicting self-defense techniques (early 19th century)

The traditional view holds that, after the outburst of production, Hokusai carefully selected and redrew the sketches, arranging them into the patterns we see today. However, Michener (1958:30-34) argues that the pattern of the images on a particular plate were arranged by the wood carvers and publishers, not by the artist himself.

== Legacy ==
The first volume of 'Manga' (defined by Hokusai as 'Brush gone wild'), was an art instruction book published to aid his troubled finances. Shortly after he removed the text and republished it. The Manga show a dedication to artistic realism in the portrayal of people and the natural world. The work was an immediate success, and the subsequent volumes soon followed. The work became known to the West after Dutch-employed German physician Philipp Franz von Siebold took lithographs of some of the sketches to Europe where they appeared in his influential book on Japan, Nippon: Archiv Zur Beschreibung von Japon in 1832. The work began to circulate in the West soon after Matthew C. Perry's entry into Japan in 1854. As a forerunner to the modern comic-strip form, the Hokusai Manga also had a notable influence on several European artists, particularly Paul Gauguin, Vincent van Gogh and Claude Monet.
