= Katsukawa =

Katsukawa may refer to:

- Katsukawa school, school of Japanese ukiyo-e art, founded by Miyagawa Shunsui
- Katsukawa Shunchō, designer of ukiyo-e style Japanese woodblock prints, active from c. 1783 to c. 1795
- Katsukawa Shunkō I (1743–1812), designer of ukiyo-e style Japanese woodblock prints in Edo (Tokyo)
- Katsukawa Shunsen, designer of books and ukiyo-e style Japanese woodblock prints
- Katsukawa Shunshō (1726–1792), Japanese painter and printmaker in the ukiyo-e style, and the leading artist of the Katsukawa school
