= Miyagawa =

Miyagawa may refer to:

- Miyagawa-chō, one of the hanamachi or geisha districts in Kyoto
- Miyagawa Dam, dam in the Fukushima Prefecture of Japan
- Miyagawa, Mie, village located in Taki District, Mie Prefecture, Japan
- Miyagawa Station, railway station in Ise

== People with the surname ==
- Asato Miyagawa (宮川 麻都; born 1998), Japanese women's footballer
- Miyagawa Chōshun (1683–1753), Japanese painter
- Daisuke Miyagawa (born 1973), Japanese comedian and actor
- Hakaru Miyagawa (1905–1949), Manager of leper hospitals
- Miyagawa Isshō, Japanese painter in the ukiyo-e style
- Kazuo Miyagawa (1908–1999), Japanese cinematographer
- Keiko Miyagawa (born 1986), Japanese sailor
- Satoshi Miyagawa (born 1977), Japanese football player
- Shigeru Miyagawa (宮川 滋; born 1948), Japanese rower
- Sho Miyagawa (born 1990), Japanese professional baseball pitcher
- Miyagawa Shunsui (c. 1740-60s), Japanese painter and printmaker
- Miyagawa Yashukichi (born 1888), Japanese drug trafficker
