= Kabukidō Enkyō =

Japanese ukiyo-e artist

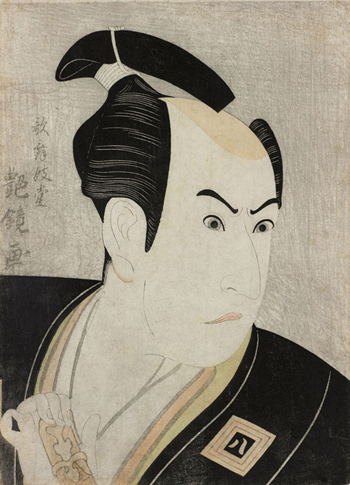
Ichikawa Yaozō III, colour woodblock print, c. 1796

Kabukidō Enkyō (歌舞伎堂 艶鏡, fl. c. 1796) was a Japanese artist who designed ukiyo-e woodblock prints. Nothing is known of Enkyō's life, and only seven of his works are known, all of which are ōkubi yakusha-e, bust portrait prints of kabuki actors. Scholars divide them into two groups based on differences in the signatures, and the second group appears to be a set, as the prints depict three brothers from the same play. Enkyō's identity has been subject to speculation: a student of Sharaku's, even Sharaku himself, or a kyōgen playwright.

== Background ==
Ukiyo-e art flourished in Japan during the Edo period from the 17th to 19th centuries. Its subjects were of the courtesans, kabuki actors, and others associated with the ukiyo hedonistic "floating world" lifestyle of the pleasure districts. Mass-produced woodblock prints were a major form of the genre. After the mid-18th century, full-colour nishiki-e prints became common, printed with a large number of woodblocks, one for each colour. Shunshō of the Katsukawa school introduced the ōkubi-e "large-headed picture" in the 1760s. He and his school soon popularized ōkubi yakusha-e, prints of actors from kabuki, a flamboyant theatrical form that enjoyed popularity with the masses.

The enigmatic print designer Sharaku's works are amongst ukiyo-e's best known. They began to appear suddenly in 1794. Sharaku introduced a greater level of realism into his yakusha-e prints that emphasized the differences between the actor and the portrayed character. The expressive, contorted faces he depicted contrasted sharply with the serene, mask-like faces more common to artists such as Harunobu or Utamaro. Sharaku's work found resistance, and in 1795 his output ceased as mysteriously as it had appeared; his identity is still unknown. Kabukidō Enkyō's ōkubi yakusha-e appeared sixteen months after Sharaku's work ceased. Nothing is known of Enkyō's life or identity beyond the bare fact that he flourished as an artist in Japan at the end of the eighteenth century.

== Works ==
Enkyō appears not to have been a prolific artist. Seven portraits were confirmed as Enkyō's in the early 20th century, and no further works have been discovered. The ōban-size (Note: Ōban is about 25 by 36 centimetres (10 in × 14 in).) yakusha-e woodblock print portraits of kabuki actors are all ōkubi-e bust portraits dated to c. 1796. None bear a publisher's seal. Scholars divide them into two groups based on differences in the artist's seal.

=== First group ===
The first group bears the seal "Kabukidō Enkyō Ga" (歌舞伎堂艶鏡画, "drawn by Kabukidō Enkyō") and is made up of:

- Ichikawa Omezō I (初代市川男女蔵 Shodai Ichikawa Omezō)
- Ichikawa Yaozō III (三代目市川八百蔵 Sandaime Ichikawa Yaozō)
- Sawamura Sōjūrō III (三代目沢村宗十郎 Sandaime Sawamura Sōjūrō)
- Nakayama Tomisaburō I (初代中山富三郎 Shodai Nakayama Tomisaburō).
Actor portraits by Kabukidō Enkyō

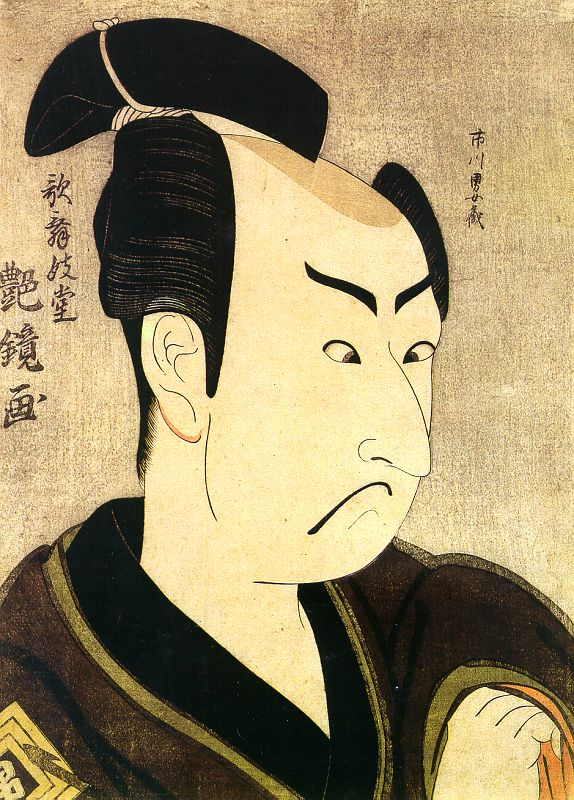
Ichikawa Omezō I

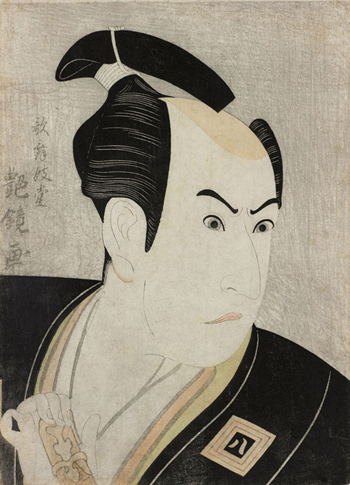
Ichikawa Yaozō III

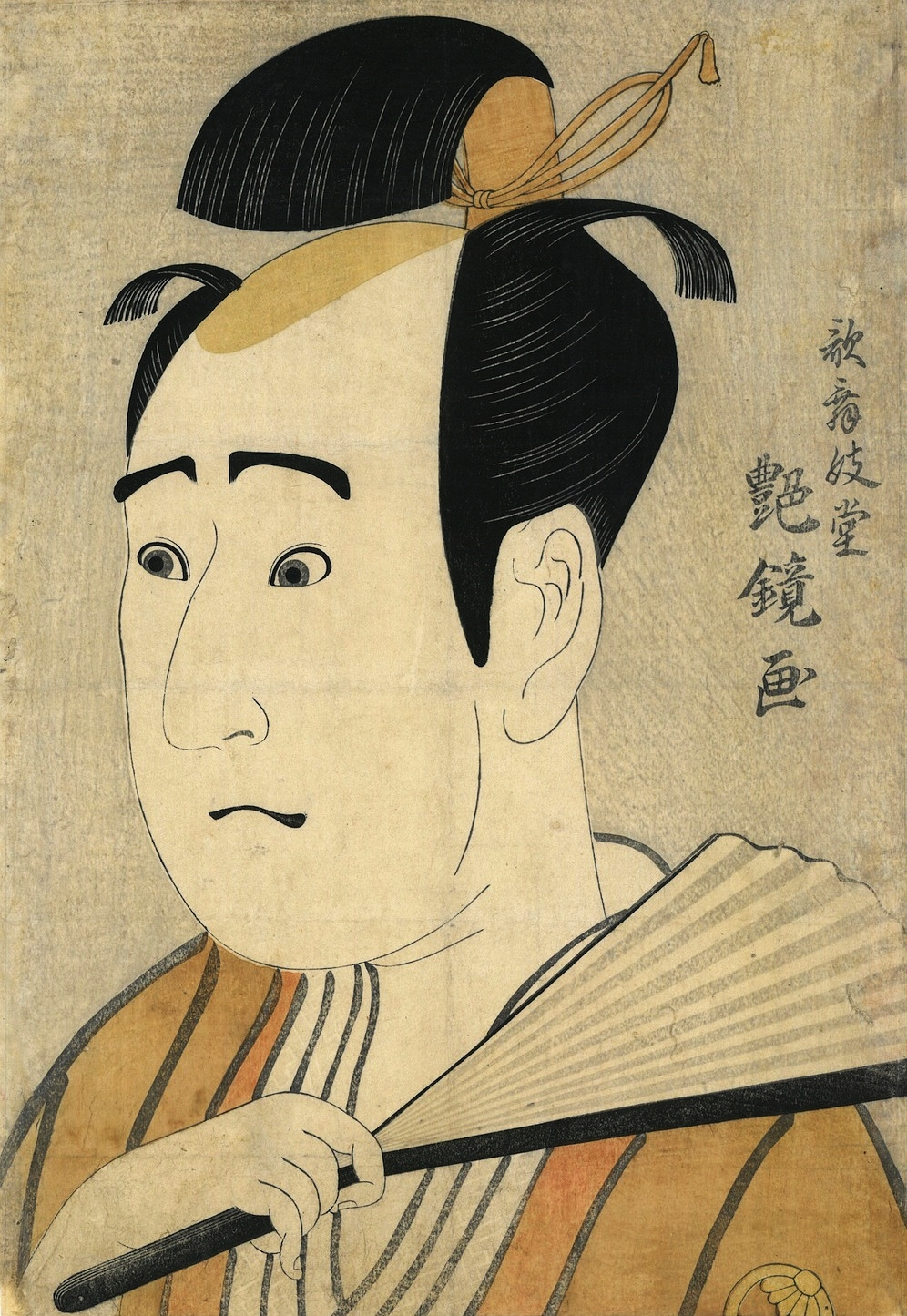
Sawamura Sōjūrō III

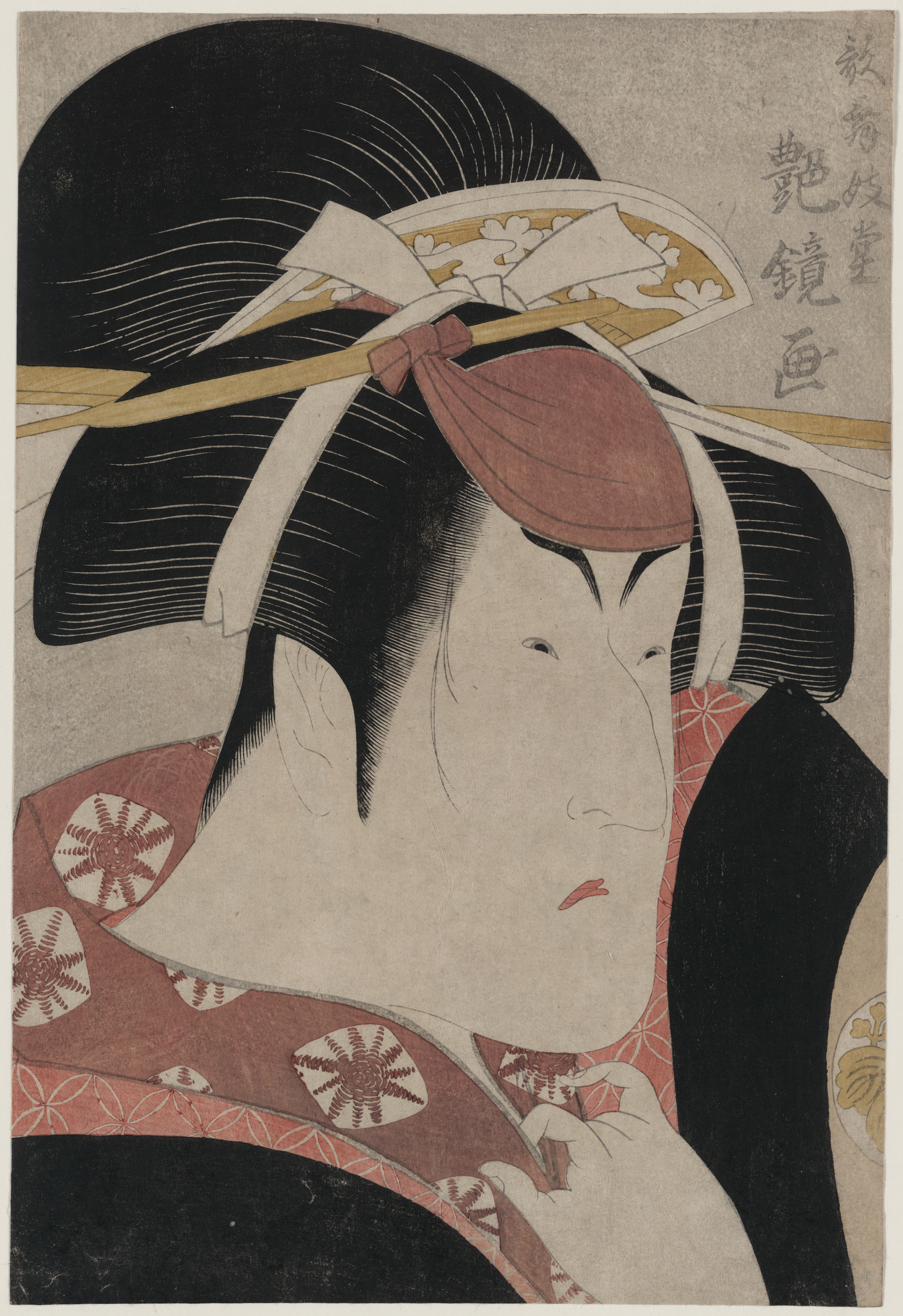
Nakayama Tomisaburō I

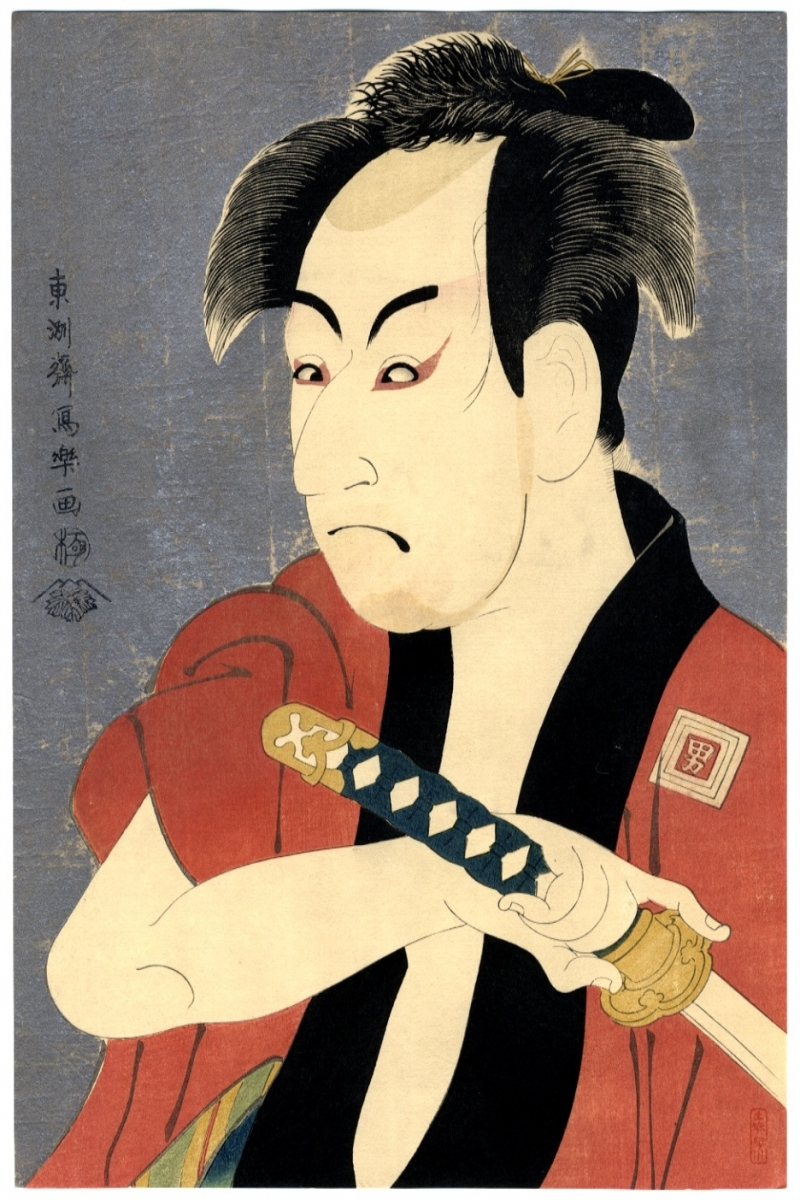
Sharaku's Ichikawa Omezō, 1794

Ichikawa Omezō I portrays a character from the kabuki play Sumida no Haru Geisha Katagi (Note: 隅田春妓女容性 Sumida no Haru Geisha Katagi) (1796). Enkyō's depiction of the warrior-like character invites comparison to Sharaku's portrait of the same, though they achieve different effects. Sharaku's has greater depth of expression, while Enkyō's simpler, more greatly exaggerated depiction with larger eyebrows leaves a strong immediate expression. Enkyō gives his Omezō a facetious expression and delineates his rounder features with a milder line. He colours the irises with thinned sumi ink, a technique Enkyō may have borrowed from Shun'ei, Toyokuni, and Kunimasa, who had introduced it about that time. Evidence of the effort put into the design can be inferred from other fine details such as touches of red on the earlobes and the colouring on the shaved part of the forehead.

It has been suggested the Ichikawa Yaozō III portrait is of a key character in the play Katakiuchi Noriyaibanashi (Note: 敵討乗合話 Katakiuchi Noriyaibanashi) (1794). It uses thinned ink to colour the irises, and the composition appears to bear the influence of Sharaku in its attempt at greater realism. The positioning of Enkyō's Nakayama Tomisaburō I, with the actor's hand on his collar, bears strong resemblance to Sharaku's version in the role of Miyagino from Katakiuchi Noriyaibanashi, suggesting Enkyō likely used Sharaku's print as a reference.

=== Second group ===
The other three prints appear to make a set as they depict three brothers from the same episode of the same play. The set is made up of:

- Nakamura Nakazō II as Matsuōmaru (二代中村仲蔵の松王丸 Nidaime Nakamura Nakazō no Matsuōmaru)
- Ichikawa Yaozō III as Umeōmaru (三代市川八百蔵の梅王丸 Sandaime Ichikawa Yaozō no Umeō)
- Nakamura Noshio II as Sakuramaru (二代中村野塩の桜丸 Nidaime Nakamura Noshio no Sakuramaru)
Portraits from Sugawara Denju Tenarai Kagami by Kabukidō Enkyō

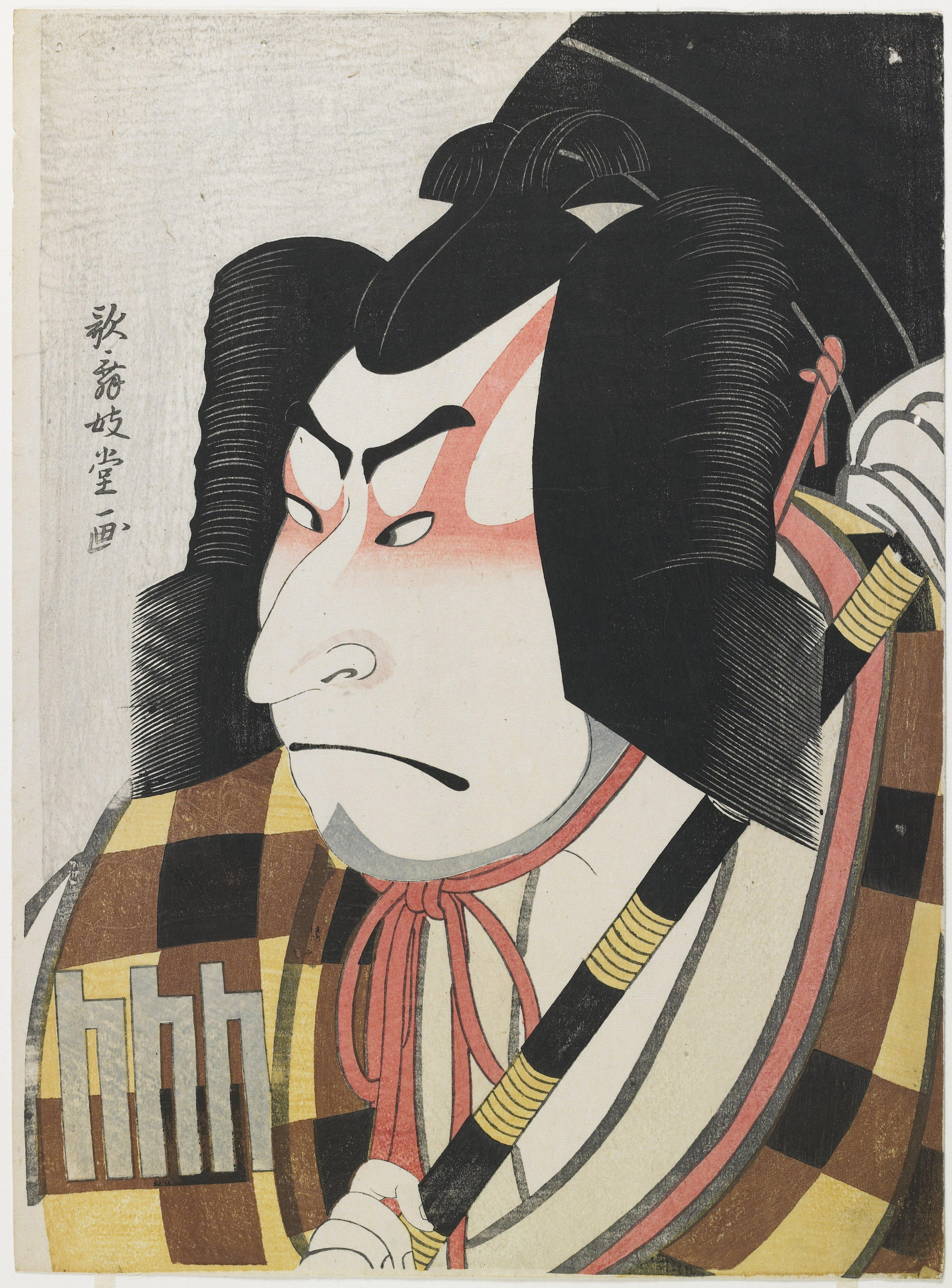
Nakamura Nakazō II as Matsuōmaru

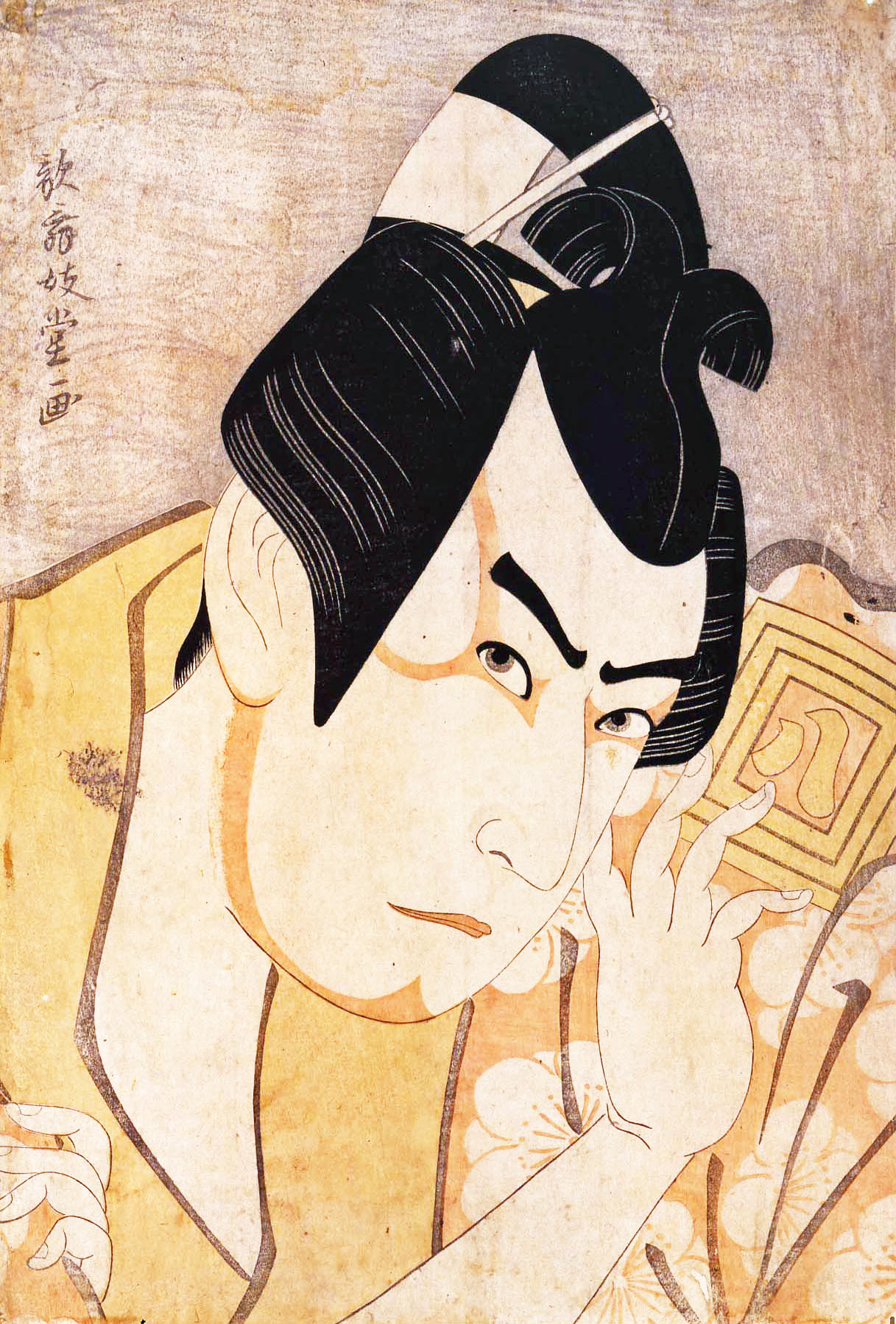
Ichikawa Yaozō III as Umeōmaru

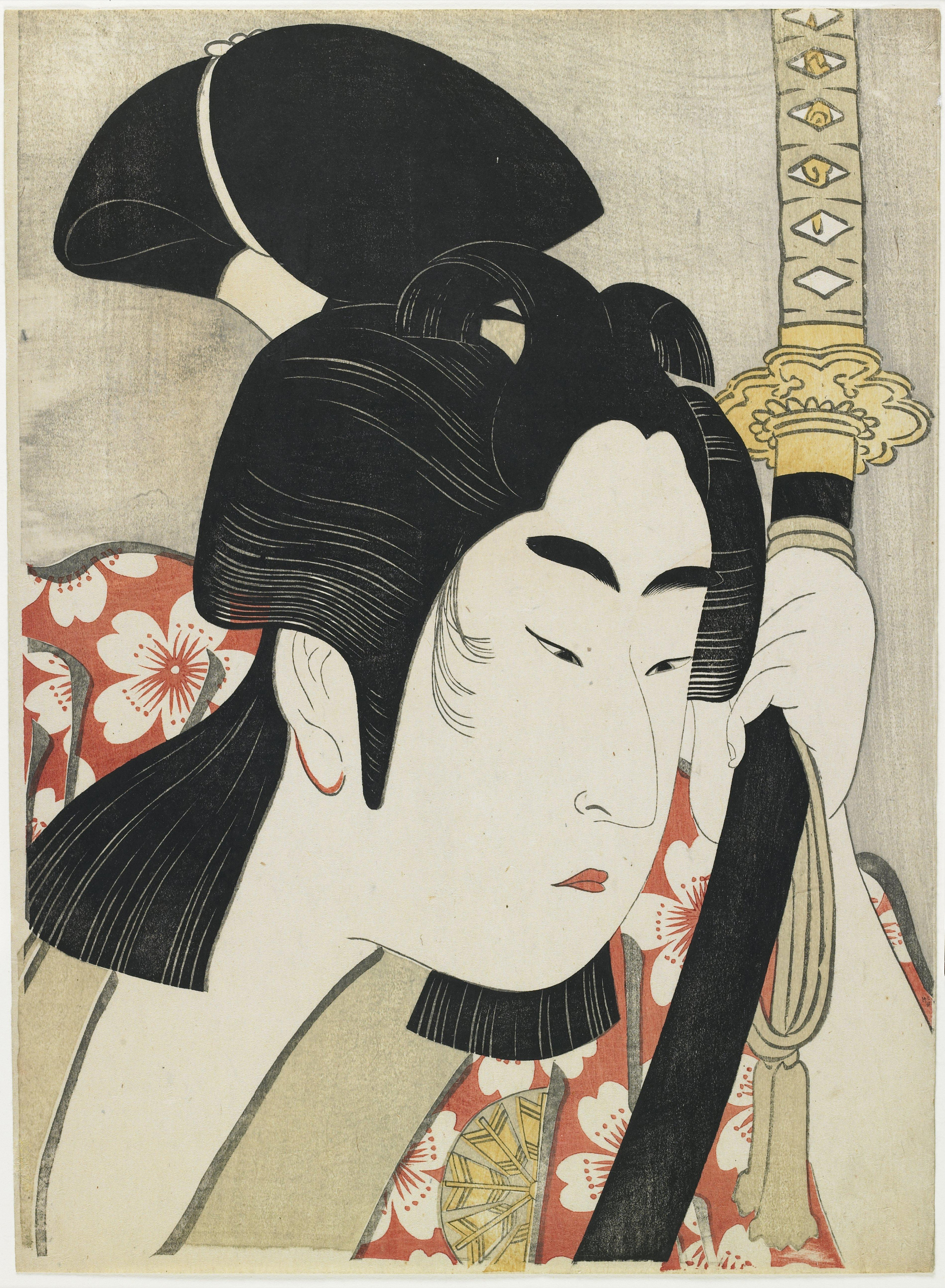
Nakamura Noshio II as Sakuramaru

This set shows a stronger Toyokuni influence, rather than Sharaku; while basically striving for realism, there is an idealizing tendency in the rendering of the facial expressions. The prints depict actors in the roles of three brothers from the "Kuruma-biki" (Note: 「車引」 Kuruma-biki) episode of the play Sugawara Denju Tenarai Kagami (1796). The scene depicts Umeōmaru and Sakuramaru waiting in ambush for Fujiwara no Shihei. Their brother Matsuōmaru, who is loyal to Shihei, foils their plot. He appears in the portrait with a protruding beak-like nose and his hair brushed back at the sides. He wears a hat, carries a spear, and wears a check-patterned robe with a set of h-shaped genji-mon crests on them, indicating a chapter from the Genji Monogatari. The Nakamura Noshio II has no seal, and the other two bear the seal "Kabukidō Ga" (歌舞伎鏡画, "drawn by Kabukidō"). The print of Nakamura Noshio II as Sakuramaru depicts the youngest of the three brothers, a romantic character whose symbol is the sakura cherry blossom. The character was sometimes performed by an onnagata, an actor specializing in female roles.

== Identity ==
Enkyō's identity is uncertain. There is a brief mention of him in the Ukiyo-e Ruikō, the earliest collection of commentaries and biographies on ukiyo-e artists, begun c. 1790 by Ōta Nanpo (1749–1823). Its single line mentions him as a portraitist who lasted merely half a year, and omits the name Enkyō. (Note: 役者似顔のみかきたれど甚しくなければ半年斗にておこなわれず Yakusha nigao nomi kakitaredo hanahanashiku nakereba hantoshi to nite okonowarazu. From the version of c. 1800.)

Some have seen Enkyō as a student and perhaps the sole successor of Sharaku. There are no records of ukiyo-e artists other than Sharaku and Enkyō making aiban-sized ōkubi-e yakusha-e during the Edo period. The German writer Julius Kurth asserted Enkyō was Sharaku, who had assumed a new identity to revive his career. The American Arthur Davison Ficke called this idea "an alluring but somewhat fantastic theory, which neither the documentary nor the internal evidence ... adequately supports", and James A. Michener agreed this was a "fanciful theory ... but nothing in the artistic content of Kabukidō's prints supports this wild guess", though "some of Sharaku's later triptychs ... are occasionally as dull as known Kabukidōs".

Hiroshi Matsuki proposed attributing 11 of Sharaku's third-period works to Enkyō, using "Morellian" techniques to compare minor details of the artist's style. These works are the only aiban-sized ōkubi yakusha-e of Sharaku's third period. (Note: Two other aiban-sized prints from Sharaku's third period are not ōkubi-e.) Amongst the details that set these works apart from Sharaku's earlier and later ones, five of these prints feature clearly visible ears, which are drawn with six lines, whereas those of Sharaku's other works are drawn with five lines. Given that Enkyō's works appeared sixteen months after Sharaku's, differences in approach such as Enkyō's thicker line and rounder eyes can be attributed to evolution of the artist's style.

Others have seen the similarities with Sharaku as superficial, and point to differences in technique and psychology of the subjects. These scholars have suggested Enkyō's approach may be closer to that of Shunkō's, Shun'ei's, Toyokuni's, or Kunimasa's.

In 1926 ukiyo-e scholar Naonari Ochiai declared Enkyō was the kyōgen playwright Nakamura Jūsuke (Note: 中村重助 Nakamura Jūsuke) (1749 – 4 November 1803). In that case, the work was the hobby of an amateur, and would have lacked a publisher's seal because it would have been printed as a special commission. However, there is no mention of any such connection in the writings of an acquaintance of Nakamura Jusuke's, Ota Nanpo.

Comparison to actor portraits by similar artists

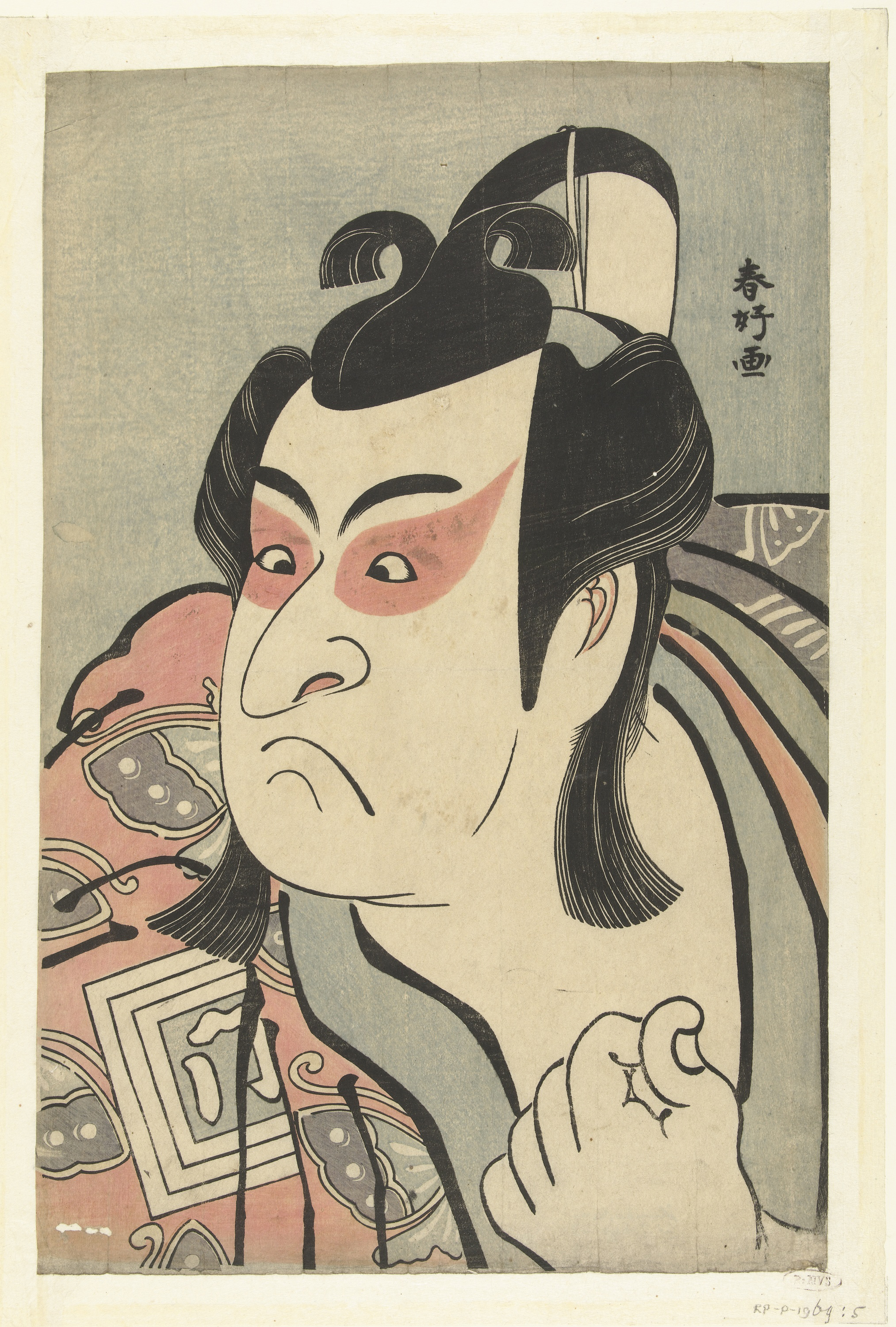
Ichikawa Monnosuke II, Shunkō, 1789

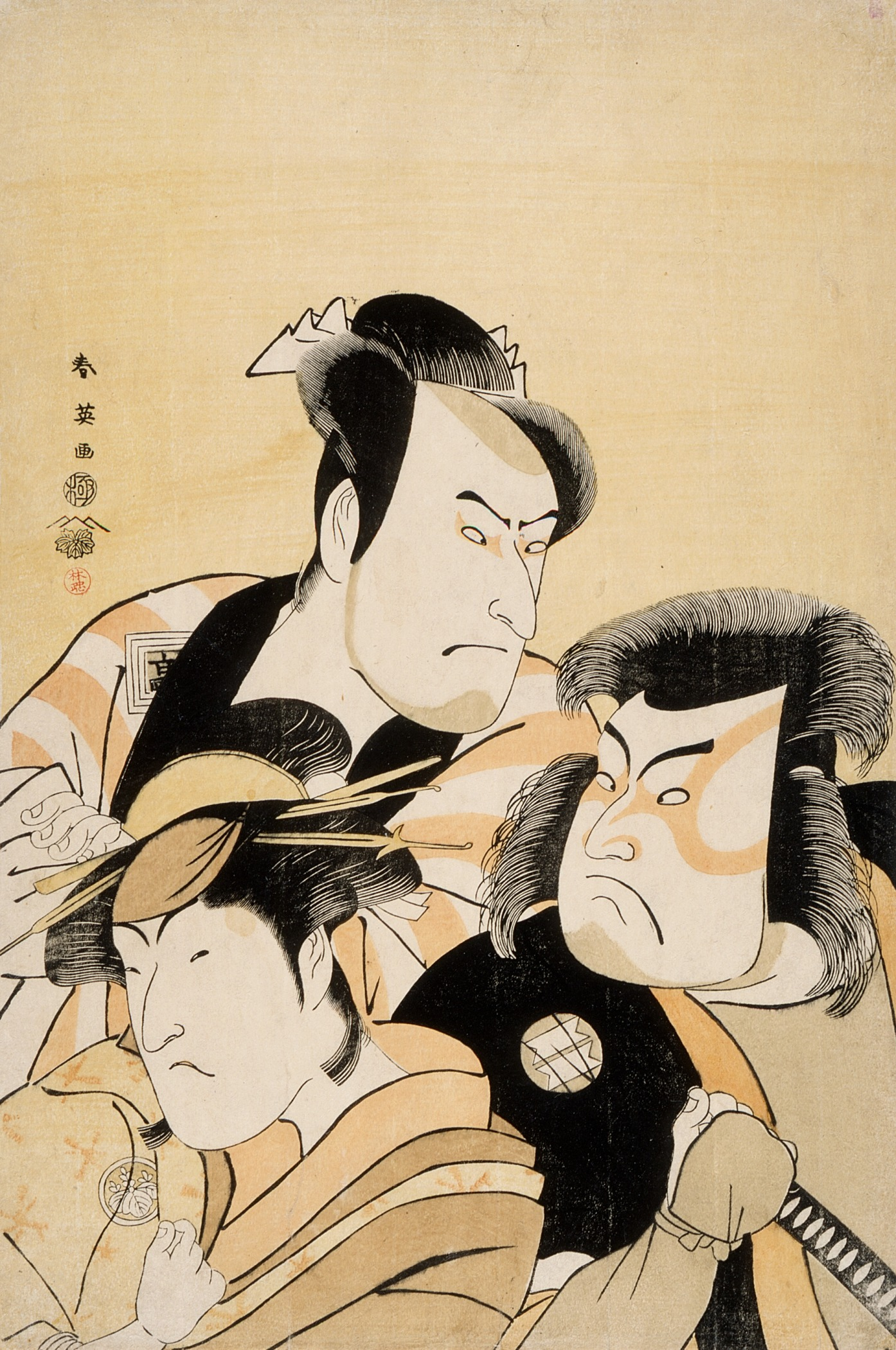
Ichikawa Komazō II, Sakata Hangōrō III, Nakayama Fukasaburō I, Shun'ei, 1794

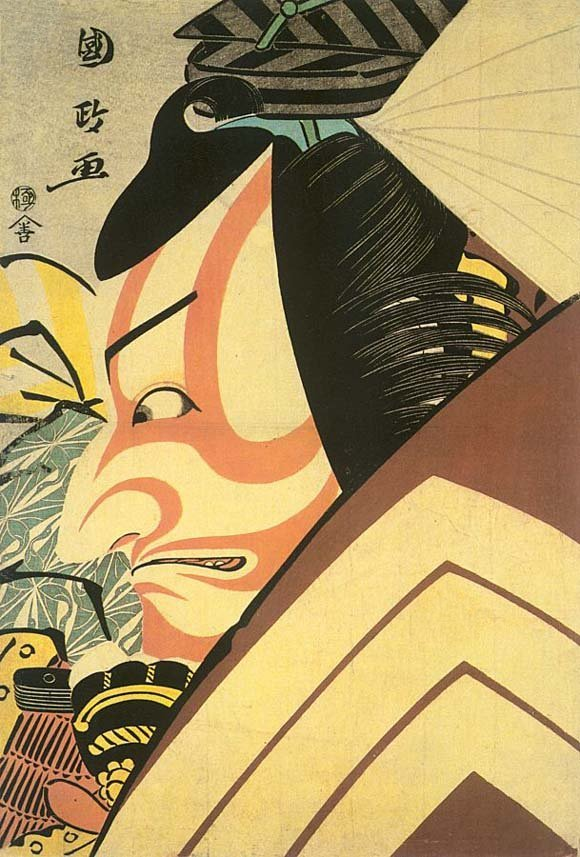
Ichikawa Ebizō, Kunimasa, 1796

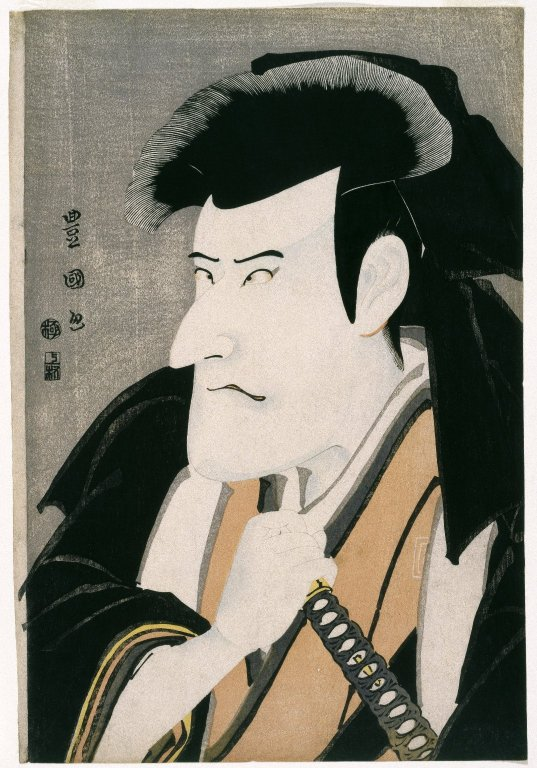
Ichikawa Komazō II, Toyokuni, 1797
