= Katsukawa school =

School of ukiyo-e art

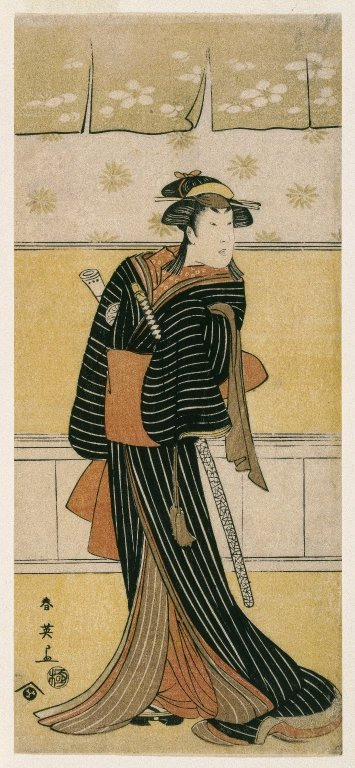
The Actor Ichikawa Monnosuke II as Karigane no Ofumi

The Katsukawa school (勝川派, -ha) was a school of Japanese ukiyo-e art, founded by Miyagawa Shunsui. It specialized in paintings (nikuhitsu-ga) and prints of kabuki actors (yakusha-e), sumo wrestlers, and beautiful women (bijin-ga).

The painter Miyagawa Shunsui changed his surname to Katsukawa. One of his students, Katsukawa Shunshō, took his surname and abandoned the school's tradition of painting well-dressed beauties in favour of yakusha-e portraits of kabuki actors, a domain once dominated by the Torii school. This new focus revived the actor print, which had lost popularity after Suzuki Harunobu's portraits of beauties rose to prominence in the late 1760s.

Shunshō's actor portraits gained particular recognition in 1768, when he published prints of five actors triumphing at the Nakamura-za theatre, a stylistic innovation that had a strong impact among kabuki enthusiasts in Edo. Together with Bunchō, Shunshō is regarded as co-creator of the nigao-e genre of individualized actor likenesses, which originated in 1770 with the publication of the Ehon butai ōgi. Carved by Endō Matsugorō and published in three volumes by Kariganeya Ihei, the work depicted each actor against a white fan-shaped ground, identified by both his stage name (geimei) and lineage name (haimyō); it is regarded as an important document for the history of Japanese theatre, and its influence extended as far as the Kamigata region, where the Osaka master Ryūkōsai Jōkei drew on the Shunshō–Bunchō method of facial likeness.

Shunshō introduced the ōkubi-e "large-headed picture" in the 1760s. He and other members of the Katsukawa school, such as Shunkō, popularized ōkubi yakusha-e prints and the dusting of mica in the backgrounds to produce a luxurious glittering effect.

Shunsui was the son and student of Miyagawa Chōshun, and he in turn taught Katsukawa Shunshō, who is regarded as one of the leading artists of the school. Shunshō personally focused on ōkubi-e headshot actor portraits in his prints, and bijin in his paintings.

Other artists of the school included Shunchō, Shun'ei, and Hokusai (as Katsukawa Shunrō).

The Katsukawa school was created as the result of political oppression of the Kanō school of painting by the Tokugawa shogunate around 1750. Many of the students of Chōshun and Shunsui were arrested and banished, and Chōshun died soon afterwards in 1752. Though the shogunate seemed benevolently inclined towards the Miyagawa school, Shunsui changed the name to Katsu-Miyagawa and then simply to Katsukawa.

The school was particularly popular in the last decades of the 18th century, and was renowned for its realistic actor portraits. Unlike those of the Torii school, which were more stylized, Katsukawa portraits sought to express the individual identities and personalities of those depicted. Around 1800, however, the Utagawa school rose to prominence, replacing the Katsukawa in producing the most popular actor portraits. The school thus came to an end around 1840.

== Members of the school ==
The members of the school are alphetically listed. The names of the students are indented below their masters.

- Katsukawa Shunshō (勝川 春章; 1726–1792)
  - Katsukawa Shunbō (勝川 春卯; active 1780–1800)
  - Katsukawa Shunchō (勝川 春潮, also written 春朝; active 1780–1795)
  - Katsukawa Shunchō (勝川 春蝶; active 1790–1800)
  - Katsukawa Shundō I (勝川 春童, also written 春道; active 1770–1790)
  - Katsukawa Shun'ei (勝川 春英; 1762–1819)
    - Katsukawa Shundō (勝川 春洞; active c. 1795 – c. 1805)
    - Katsukawa Shundō II (二代目 勝川 春童; active 1805–1830)
    - Katsukawa Shun'en (勝川 春艶; active 1787–1795)
    - Katsukawa Shungyoku (勝川 春玉; active 1800–1830)
    - Katsukawa Shunjō (勝川 春常; d. 1787, active 1777–1785)
      - Katsukawa Shōju (勝川 正壽 (??); active 1790–1800)
    - Katsukawa Shunkei (勝川 春景; active 1820–1830)
    - Katsukawa Shunkō (勝川 春幸; active 1805–1830)
    - Katsukawa Shunkyū (勝川 春久; active 1800–1830)
    - Katsukawa Shunrin (勝川 春林; active 1784–1800)
    - Katsukawa Shunrin (勝川 春琳; active 1820–1830)
    - Katsukawa Shunsai (勝川 春斎; active 1830–1840)
    - Katsukawa Shunsei (勝川 春青; active vers 1810)
    - Katsukawa Shunsei (勝川 春清; active 1820–1830)
    - Katsukawa Shunsen (勝川 春扇; active c. 1805–1820), later called Katsukawa Shunkō II (勝川 春好)
    - Katsukawa Shunsetsu (勝川 春雪; active 1805–1815)
    - Katsukawa Shunshō II (勝川 春章; active 1820–1830)
    - Katsukawa Shuntei I (勝川 春亭; 1770–1820)
      - Katsukawa Shuntei II (勝川 春亭; d. 1856)
        - Katsukawa Shuntei III} (勝川 春亭; 1837–1902)
    - Katsukawa Shuntoku (勝川 春徳; active c. 1790–1820)
    - Katsugawa Shun'yō (勝川 春陽; active 1820–1830)
    - Katsugawa Shunyū (勝川 春雄; active 1805–1830)
  - Katsugawa Shungyō (勝川 春暁; active 1780–1840)
  - Katsukawa Shunkaku (勝川 春鶴; active 1790–1800)
  - Katsukawa Shunkō (勝川 春光; active 1770–1790)
  - Katsukawa Shunkō (勝川 春紅; active 1790–1820)
  - Katsukawa Shunkō I (勝川 春好, signed also Shunō 春翁; 1743–1812)
  - Katsukawa Shunkyoku (勝川 春旭; active 1775–1800)
  - Katsukawa Shunri (勝川 春里; active 1780–1800)
  - Katsukawa Shunryū (勝川 春龍; active 1790–1800)
  - Katsukawa Shunryū (勝川 春柳; active 1790–1800)
  - Katsukawa Shunrin (勝川 春林; active 1781–1801)
  - Katsukawa Shunrō I (勝川 春朗; 1760–1849), later called Katsushika Hokusai (葛飾 北斎)
    - Katsukawa Shunrō II (勝川 春朗; d. 1817, active 1785–1797), later called Utagawa Toyomaru (歌川 豊丸)
  - Katsukawa Shunsen (勝川 春川; active c. 1780)
  - Katsukawa Shunsen (勝川 春泉; active 1780–1800)
  - Katsukawa Shunsui (勝川 春水; active 1770s), later called Tamagawa Shunsui (玉川 春水)
  - Katsukawa Shunwa (勝川 春和; active 1790–1830)
  - Katsukawa Shunzan I (勝川 春山; active 1778–1800)
    - Katsukawa Shunzan II (勝川 春山, d. 1871)

The follow artists are also associated with the Katsukawa school, though they do not bear the surname:

- Kinshōdō Sekiga (金長洞 石賀; active 1770s–1780s)
- Koikawa Harumachi I (恋川 春町; 1744–1789)
  - Koikawa Harumachi II (恋川 春町; active c. 1800–1830), later called Kitagawa Utamaro II (喜多川 歌麿)
  - Koikawa Harumasa (恋川 春政; active 1800–1820), later called Banki Harumasa (晩器 春政)
