= Enkyō =

"Enkyō" may refer to:

== Japanese era names ==
- Enkyō (Kamakura period) (延慶), 1308–1311–an era in the Kamakura period, also known as "Engyō" and "Enkei"
- Enkyō (Edo period) (延享), 1744–1748–an era in the Edo period

== People ==
- Kabukidō Enkyō, a 17th-century Japanese artist
- Enkyo Pat O'Hara, an American Soto priest and teacher in the Harada-Yasutani lineage of Zen Buddhism
