= Katsukawa Shun'ei =

Japanese ukiyo-e artist

Katsukawa Shun'ei (Japanese: 勝川 春英; 1762 – 13 December 1819) was a Japanese ukiyo-e artist.

Shun'ei's real surname was Isoda (磯田), and his father was a landlord named Isoda Jirōbei (磯田 次郎兵衛). His earliest known work, from 1778, is a yakusha-e signed with his personal name, Kyūjirō; another of his gō was Kyūtokusai.

Shun'ei belonged to the Katsukawa school of artists; his earliest work dates to 1778. He designed mainly yakusha-e portraits of kabuki actors, and began producing ōkubi-e bust portraits as early as 1791. As early as January 1794, Shun'ei was producing yakusha ōkubi-e with mica backgrounds in the aiban format, four months before the better-known and more critically acclaimed examples by Sharaku in ōban format, though Shun'ei's earliest aiban ōkubi-e were kuro-kira-e (with black rather than silver mica grounds). Together with Toyokuni I he illustrated the five-volume kabuki guide called Shibai kinmō zue ("Illustrated Guide to the Theatre") by Shikitei Sanba. He also made musha-e warrior prints and prints of sumo wrestlers. In c. 1800 he took over as head from his teacher, Shunshō. His most prominent students were Katsukawa Shuntei and Katsukawa Shunsen. Shun'ei and several other artists, including Utamaro and Toyokuni, were jailed and manacled for 50 days in 1804 for producing prints depicting Toyotomi Hideyoshi based on the Ehon taikōki ("Illustrated Chronicles of the Regent").

Prints by Shun'ei

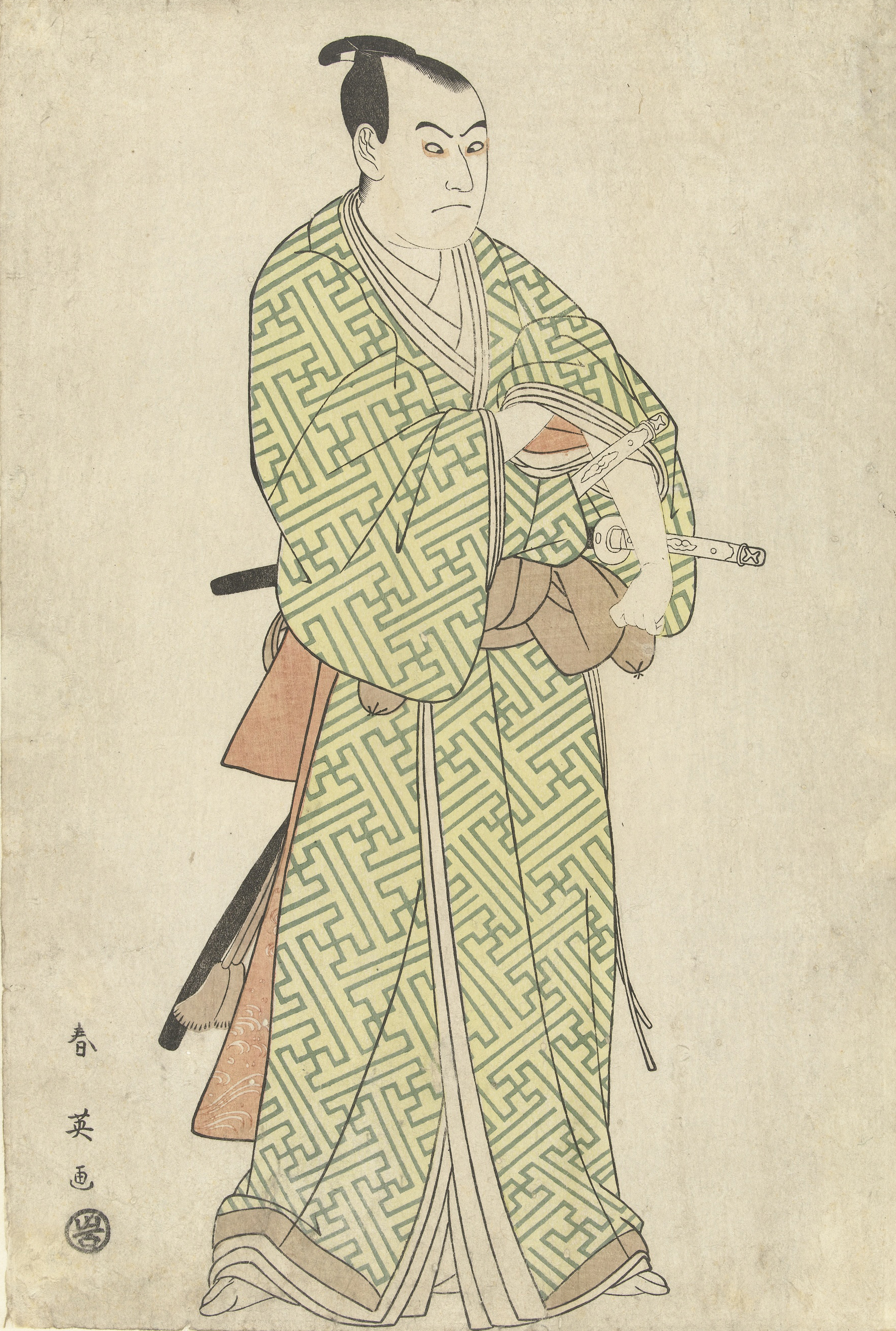

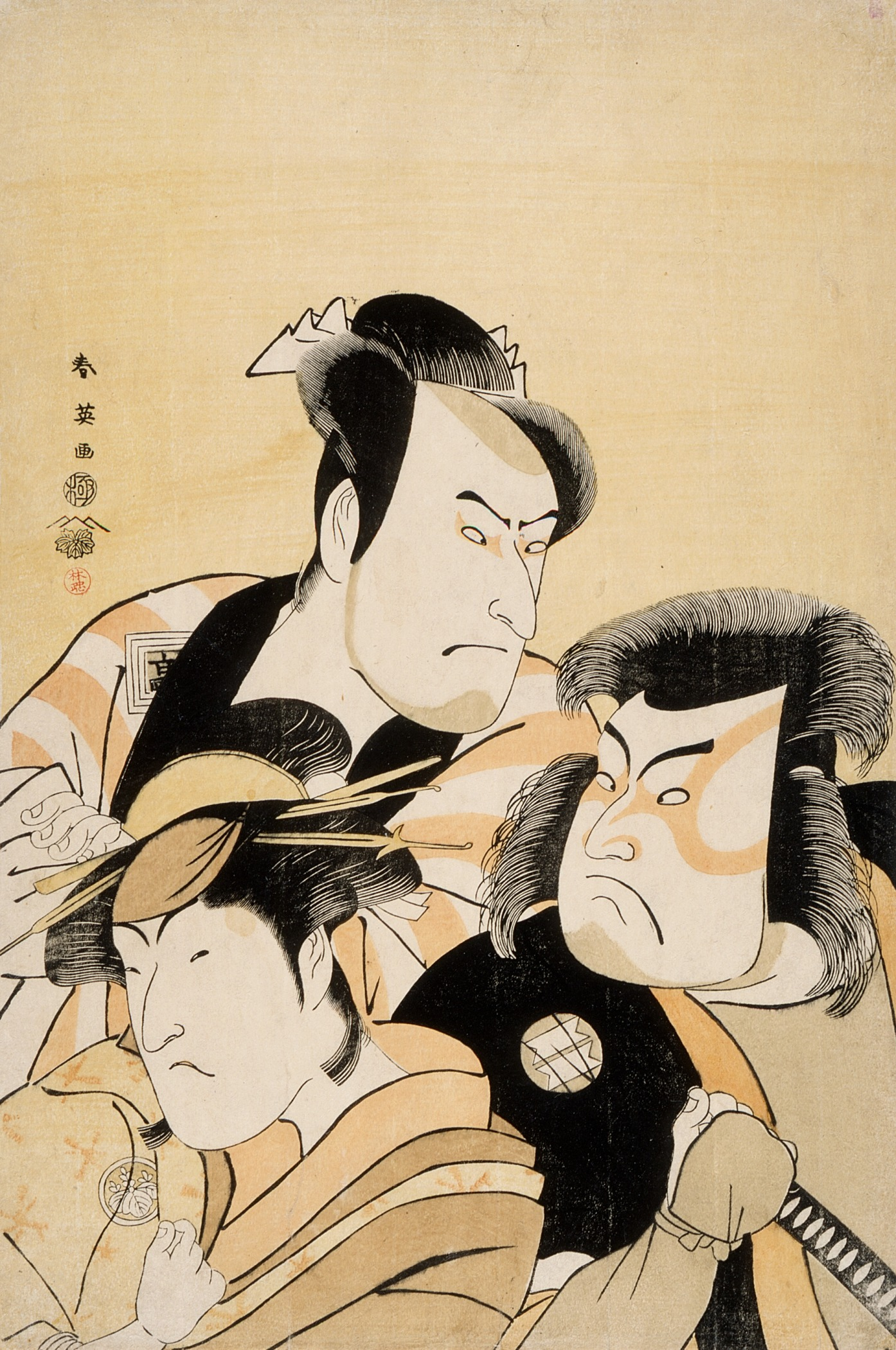

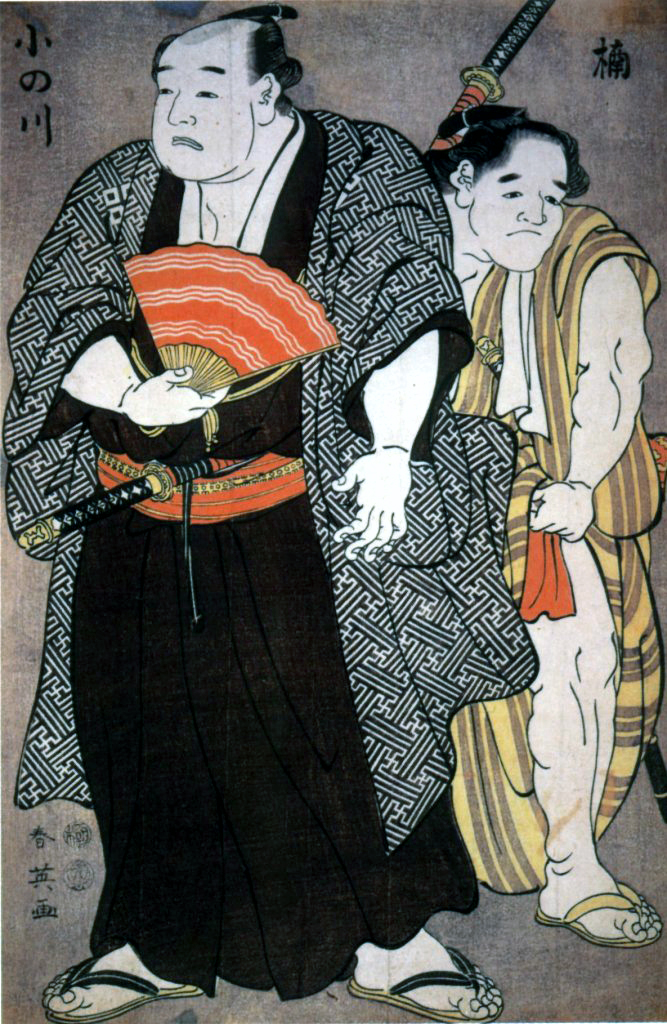

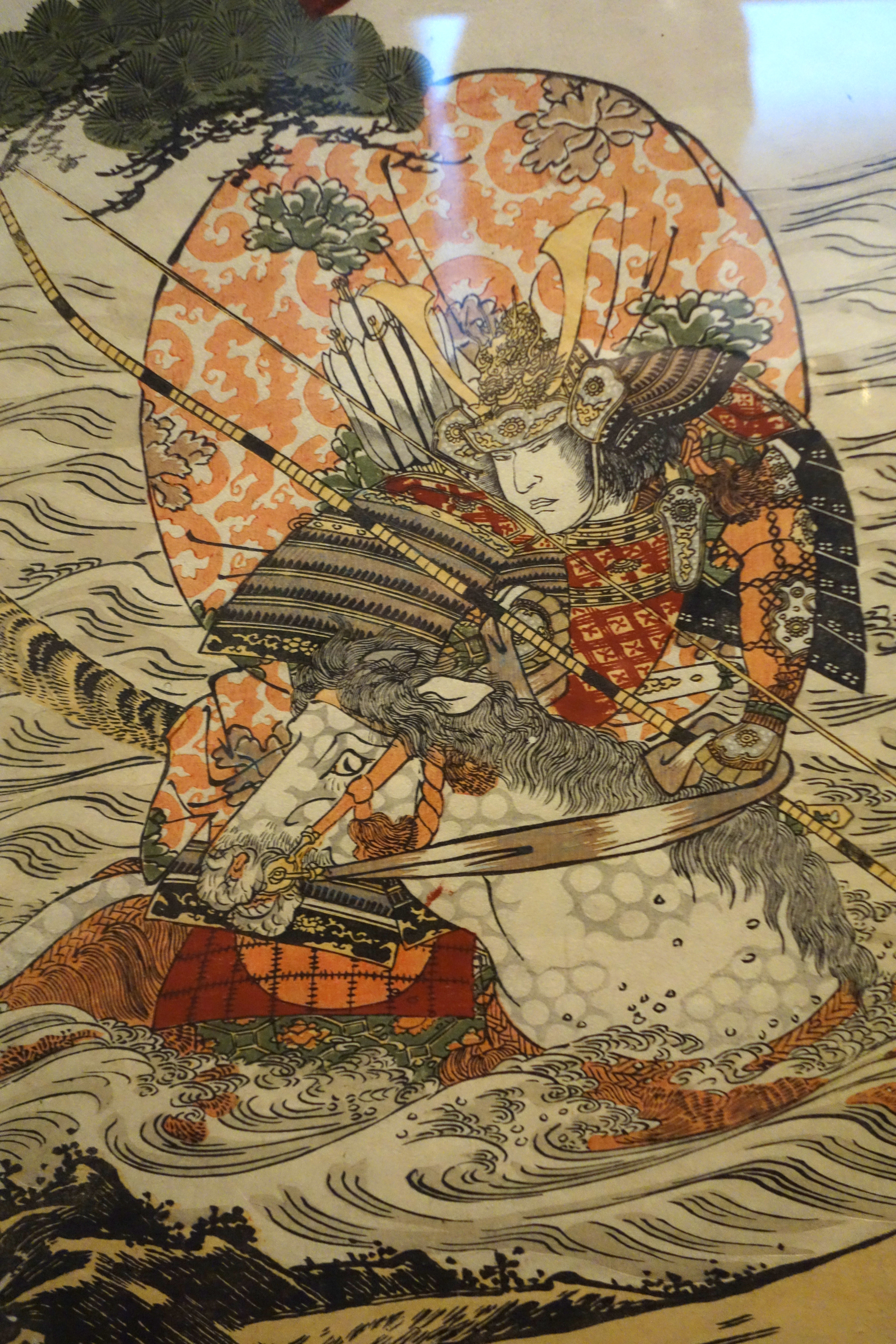

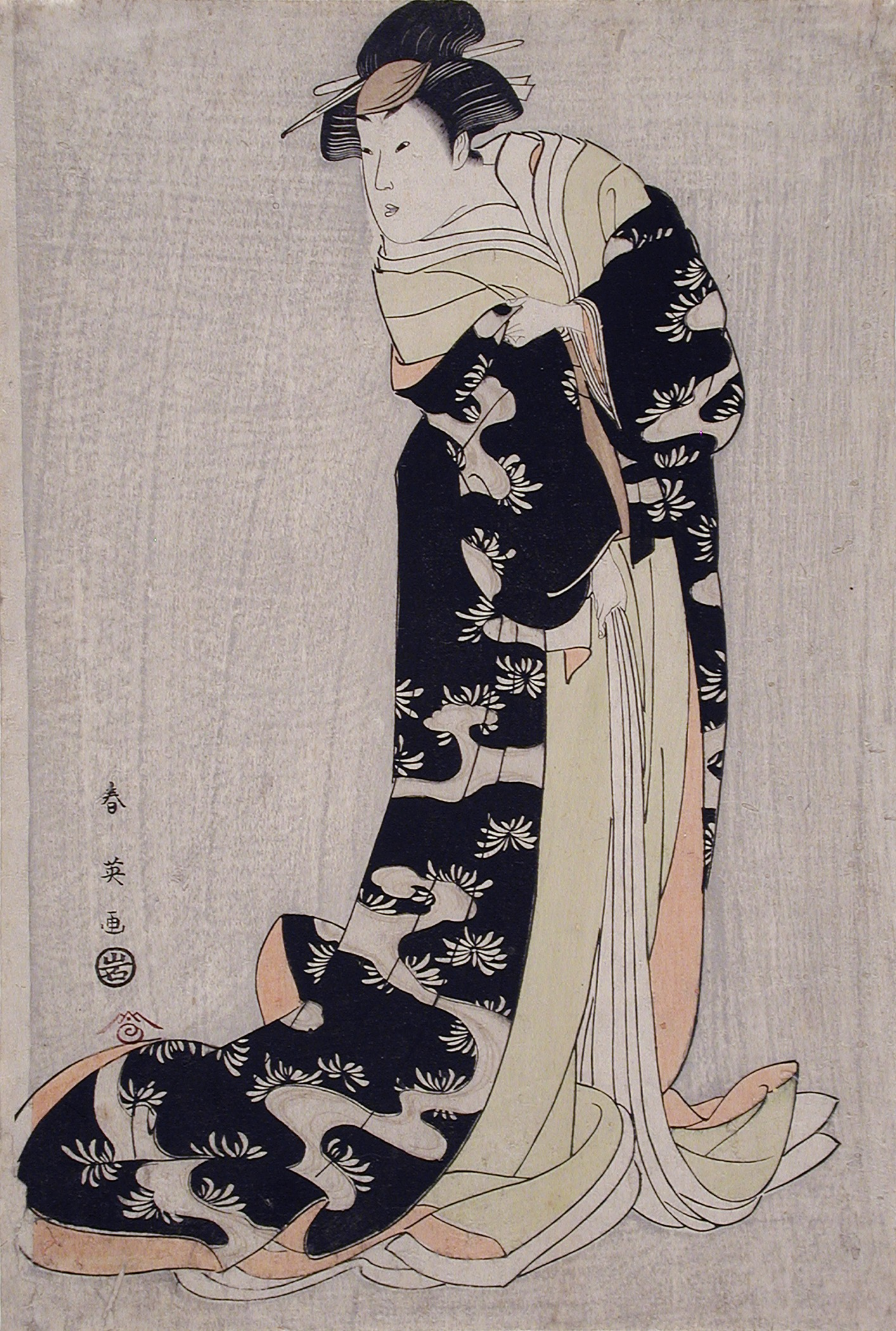
