= Miyagawa Isshō =

Japanese painter

- 宮川 一笑
- Born: 1689
- Died: January 20, 1780 (aged 90); Nii-jima
- Style: Ukiyo-e

Miyagawa Isshō (宮川 一笑, 1689 – 20 January 1780) was a Japanese painter in the ukiyo-e style, primarily depicting kabuki actors, geisha, sumo wrestlers, and other elements of everyday urban culture. He used several other names: Fujiwara Andō (藤原 安道), Kohensai (湖辺斎) and others; his common name was Kiheiji (喜平治). Among his other art names was also Sōgan.

The majority of Isshō's works that survive come from the Kyōhō era (1716–1736). He was a pupil of Miyagawa Chōshun (1682–1752), who, in turn, was influenced by the works of Hishikawa Moronobu. Isshō lived in the Shiba district of Edo, and, unlike most ukiyo-e artists, he did not design woodblock prints, concentrating instead exclusively on luxury paintings. His style is characterised by figures with drooping eyes and generally pinched features, and he frequently reused successful compositions. Like many ukiyo-e artists, Isshō also produced a number of shunga, paintings of erotic scenes.

Isshō was banished from Edo in 1751, along with his master Chōshun, to the island of Niijima off the Izu Peninsula for a year. This came after a dispute arose over the payment for a painting commission in Nikkō. A Kanō school artist commissioned Chōshun to paint some of the walls of the Nikkō Tōshō-gū but refused or was unable to pay. In the ensuing confrontation, the Kanō artist and two others were killed by Isshō and Chōshun's son. Isshō was never pardoned and died on 20 January 1780.

== Selected works ==
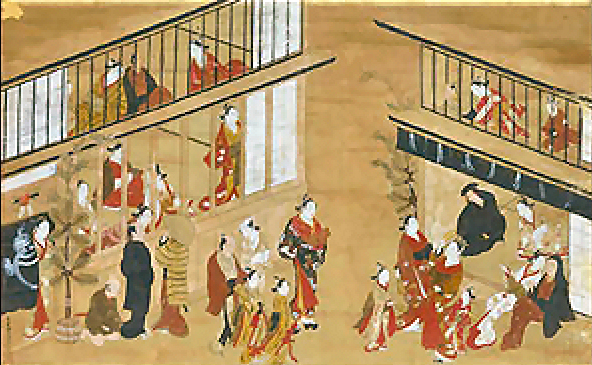
Miyagawa Isshō painting. Untitled.

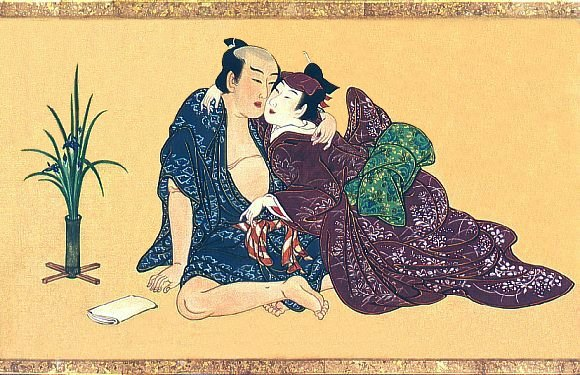
From the Spring Pastimes series.

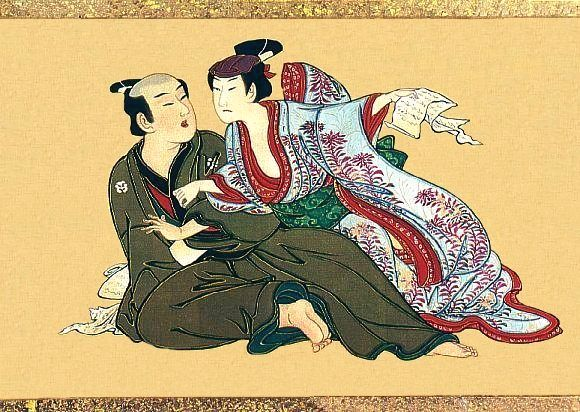
From the Spring Pastimes series.

== See also ==
- Media related to Miyagawa Isshō at Wikimedia Commons
