= Miyagawa Chōshun =

Japanese painter (1683-1753)

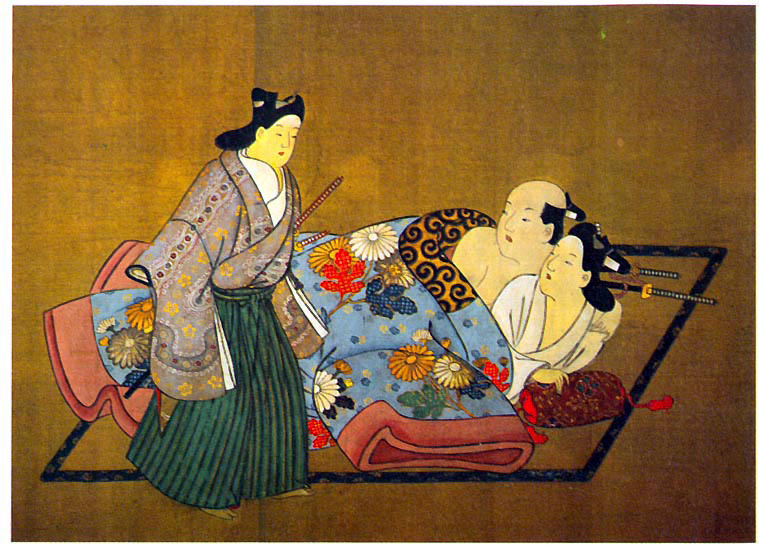

Miyagawa Chōshun (Japanese: 宮川 長春; 1683 – 18 December 1753) was a Japanese painter in the ukiyo-e style. Founder of the Miyagawa school, he and his pupils are among the few ukiyo-e artists to have never created woodblock prints. He was born in Miyagawa, in Owari Province, but lived much of his later life in Edo, where he died.

Chōshun trained under artists of the Tosa and Kanō schools, as well as under the master of early ukiyo-e, Hishikawa Moronobu. These influences are evident in his works, along with those of the Kaigetsudō school, but ultimately Chōshun, as the founder of a new school of painting, has a unique style all his own. His figures have a soft, warm femininity about them, and Richard Lane considers his coloring among the best in all of ukiyo-e art. His works are almost exclusively of courtesans, and in his works these figures are fuller, and more voluptuous than those of many other artists, in particular those of the somewhat later artist Harunobu. Though many of his pieces are clean ones of courtesans, Chōshun and his students also produced a great number of works of shunga (erotic paintings).

Miyagawa Chōshun had a number of pupils, including his son Shunsui, Chōki (who may have also been his son), and Isshō. Shunsui, active from around 1740 to 1760, is also known as Katsukawa Shunsui, having taught Katsukawa Shunshō and founded the Katsukawa school; his personal name was Toshirō, but he chose Shunsui as his gō.

In 1751, a few years before his death, Chōshun was commissioned by an artist of the Kanō school to perform some restoration work at the Nikkō Tōshō-gū. When Chōshun was not paid for his work, an altercation erupted which ended in the death of the Kanō artist at the hands of Chōshun's son. As a result, Chōshun was banished from Edo for a year.

== Gallery ==
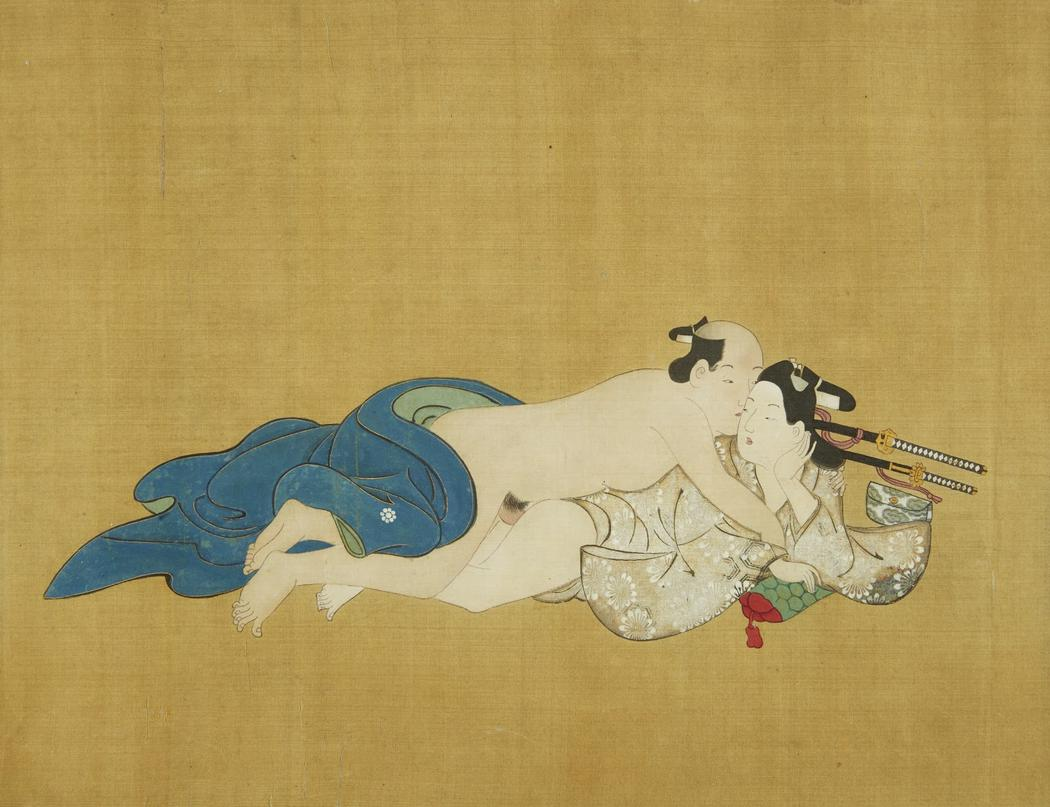
Nanshoku (male-male) shunga handscroll

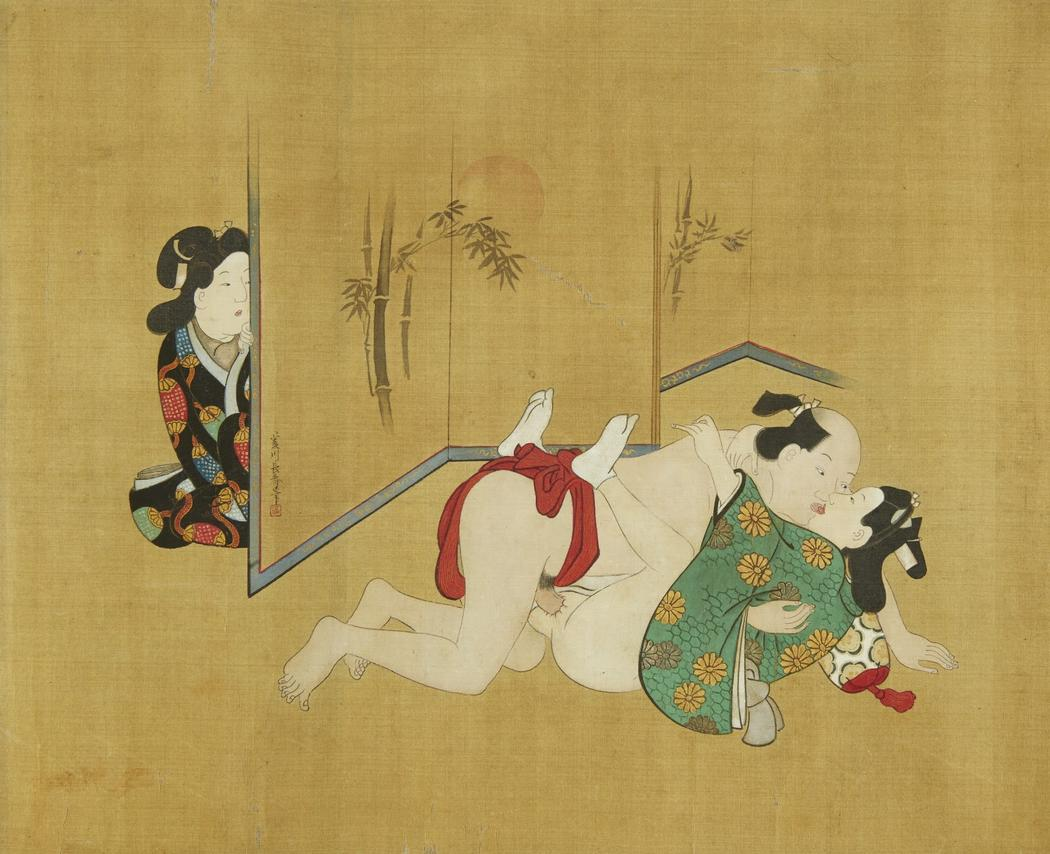
Nanshoku (male-male) shunga handscroll

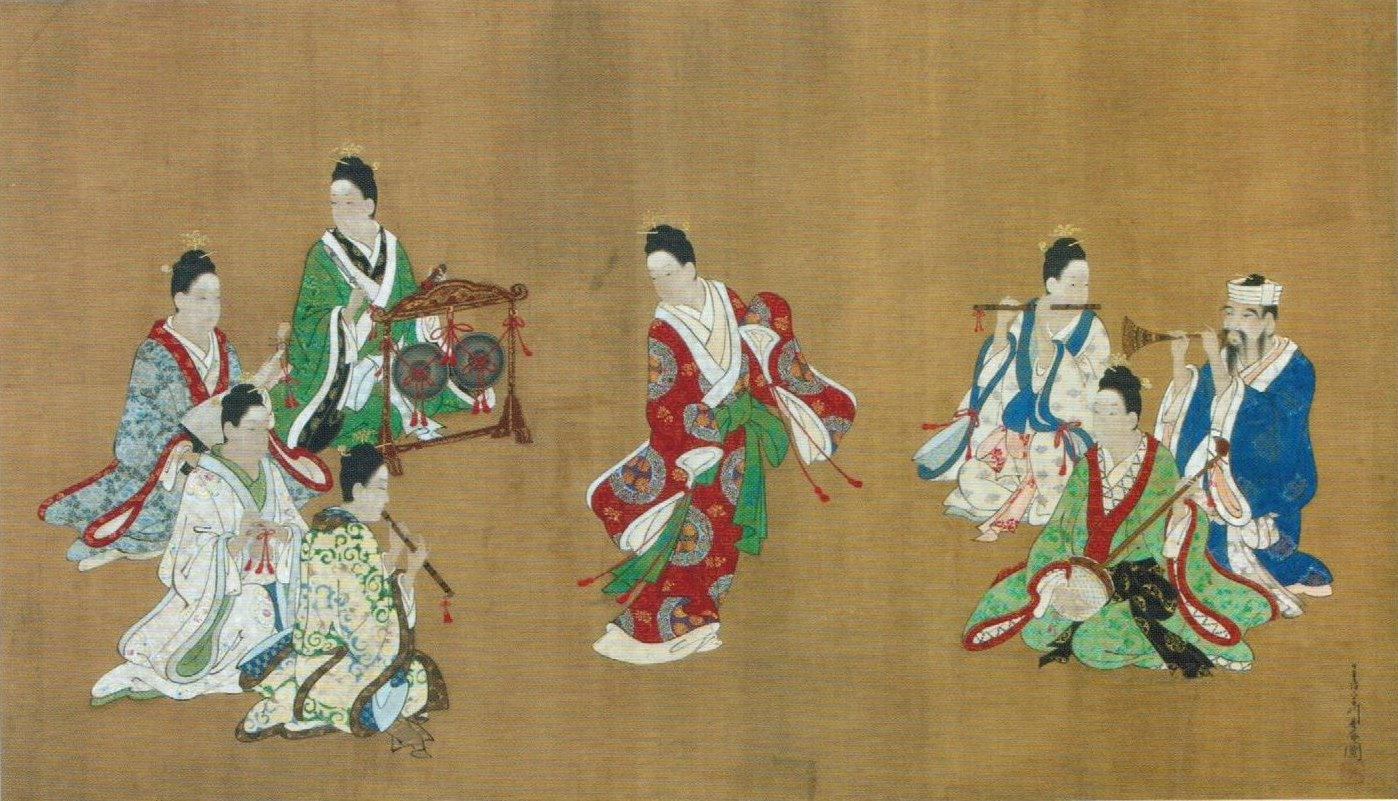
Ryūkyūan Dancer and Musicians, c. 1718

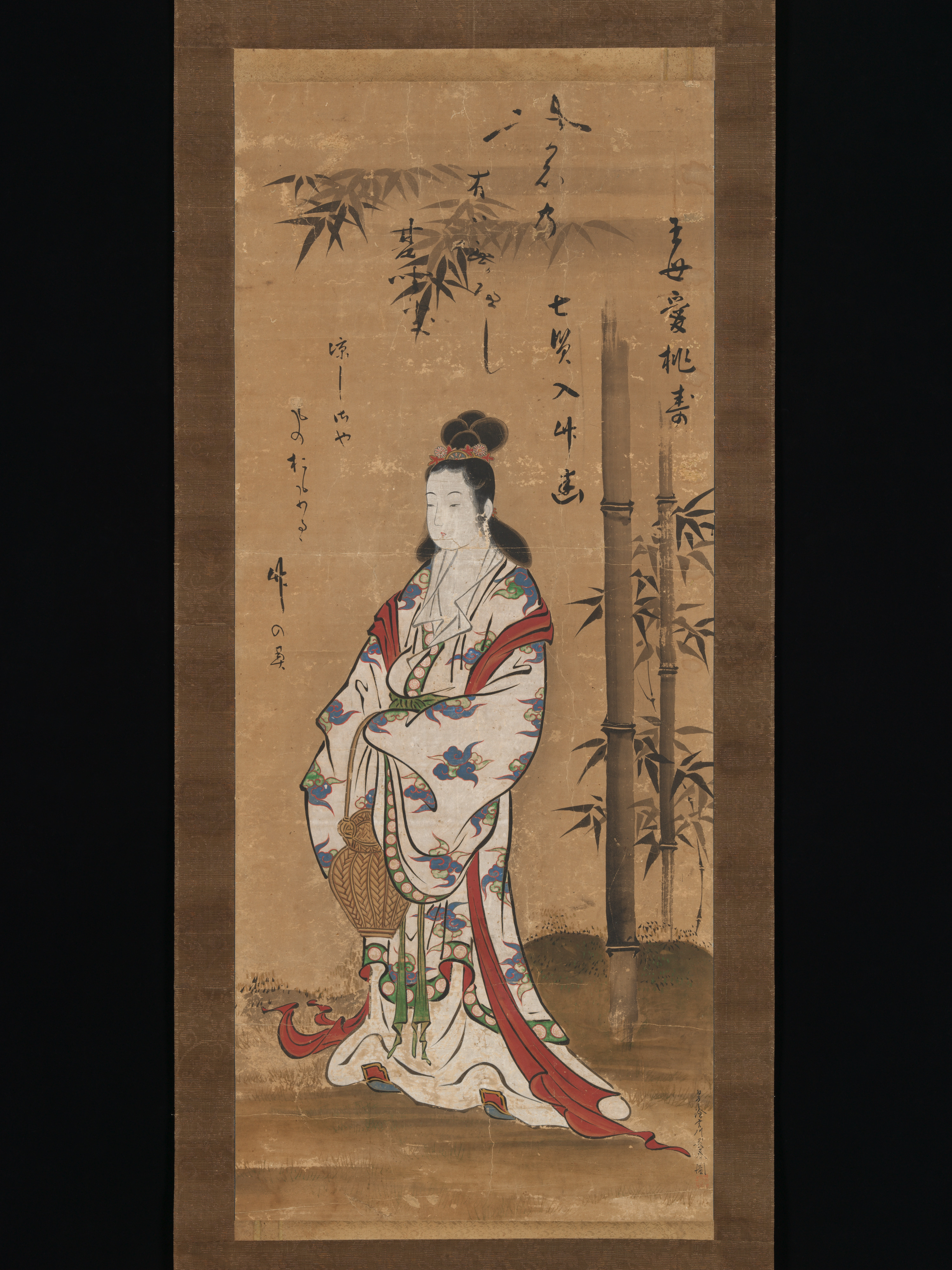
Gyoran Kannon, a bijin-ga scroll
