= Miyagawa Shunsui =

Japanese painter and printmaker

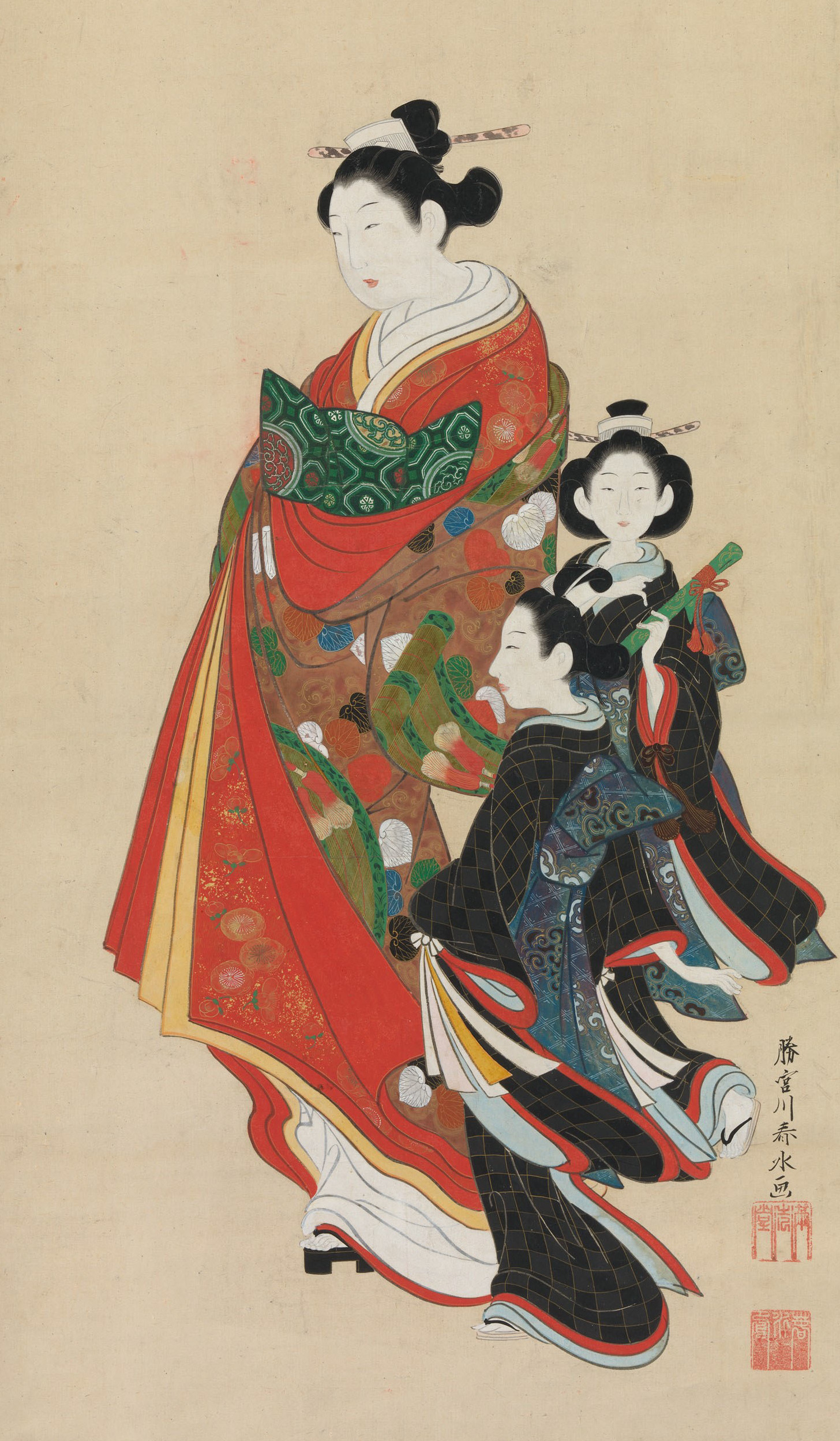
Painting by Miyagawa Shunsui

Miyagawa Shunsui (宮川 春水, fl. c. 1740s–1760s) was a Japanese painter and printmaker in the ukiyo-e style. He is sometimes known as Katsukawa Shunsui, having taught Katsukawa Shunshō and founded the Katsukawa school style. Shunsui was the son and student of artist Miyagawa Chōshun; he was originally named Tōshirō, and chose Shunsui as his art-name (gō).
