= Bunchō =

Japanese painter

Ippitsusai Bunchō (一筆斎文調, fl. 1755–1791) was a Japanese ukiyo-e artist, best known for his yakusha-e actor prints in narrow hosoban dimensions. Bunchō and Katsukawa Shunshō are credited with having developed kabuki actor portraiture focuses on producing likenesses of the subjects, rather than stereotyped faces.

Little is known about Bunchō's life. His birth surname was Mori, and he is believed to have studied painting under Ishikawa Yukimoto of the Kanō school. Bunchō was born in Edo in 1726; his colloquial name was Kishi Uemon, and he used the gō Soyōan and Hajintei. Besides Ishikawa Yukimoto, some historians also credit Ishikawa Kōgen as a teacher.

The earliest known works attributed to Bunchō are the illustrations to Hachimonji Jishō II's Eiga asobi nidai otoko (1755). Between 1766 and 1774 he made a large number of actor prints in the narrow vertical hosoban dimensions. In 1770 he produced the three-volume Ehon butai ōgi (絵本舞台扇, "Picture-book of Stage Fans") with Katsukawa Shunshō, which depicts the leading kabuki actors of the day on ōgi hand fans; Bunchō handled the onnagata—male actors who portray female characters. It was popular and went through multiple printings.

From 1769 he also made bijin-ga prints of female beauties that show the influence of Suzuki Harunobu. These became his major subject, and in the An'ei era (1772–81) no actor prints of his are known.

Bunchō's last known work was an e-goyomi picture calendar from 1790. He had few students, one of whom was Kishi Bunshō (1754–96).

Works by Ippitsusai Bunchō

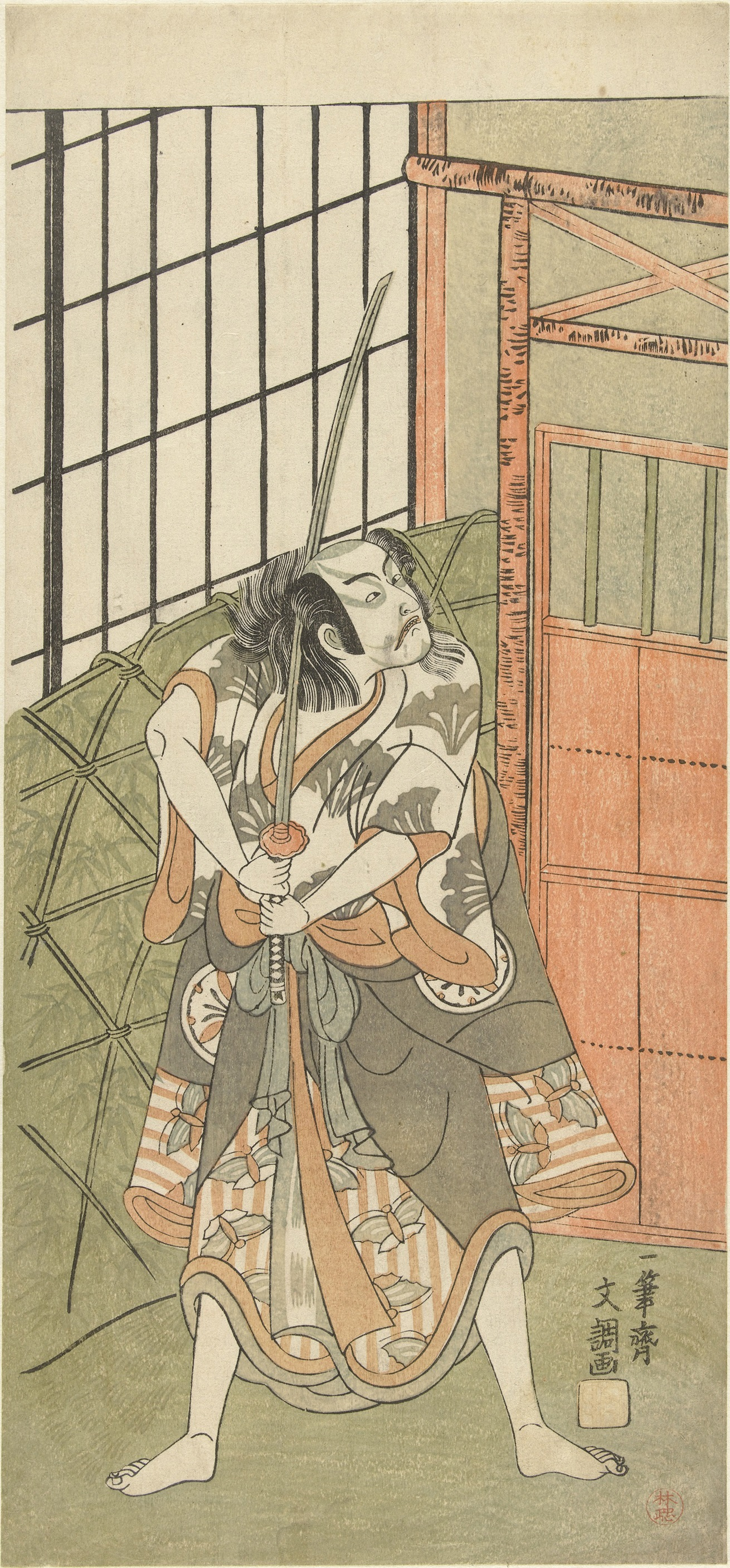
Matsumoto Koshiro III as Soga no Goro

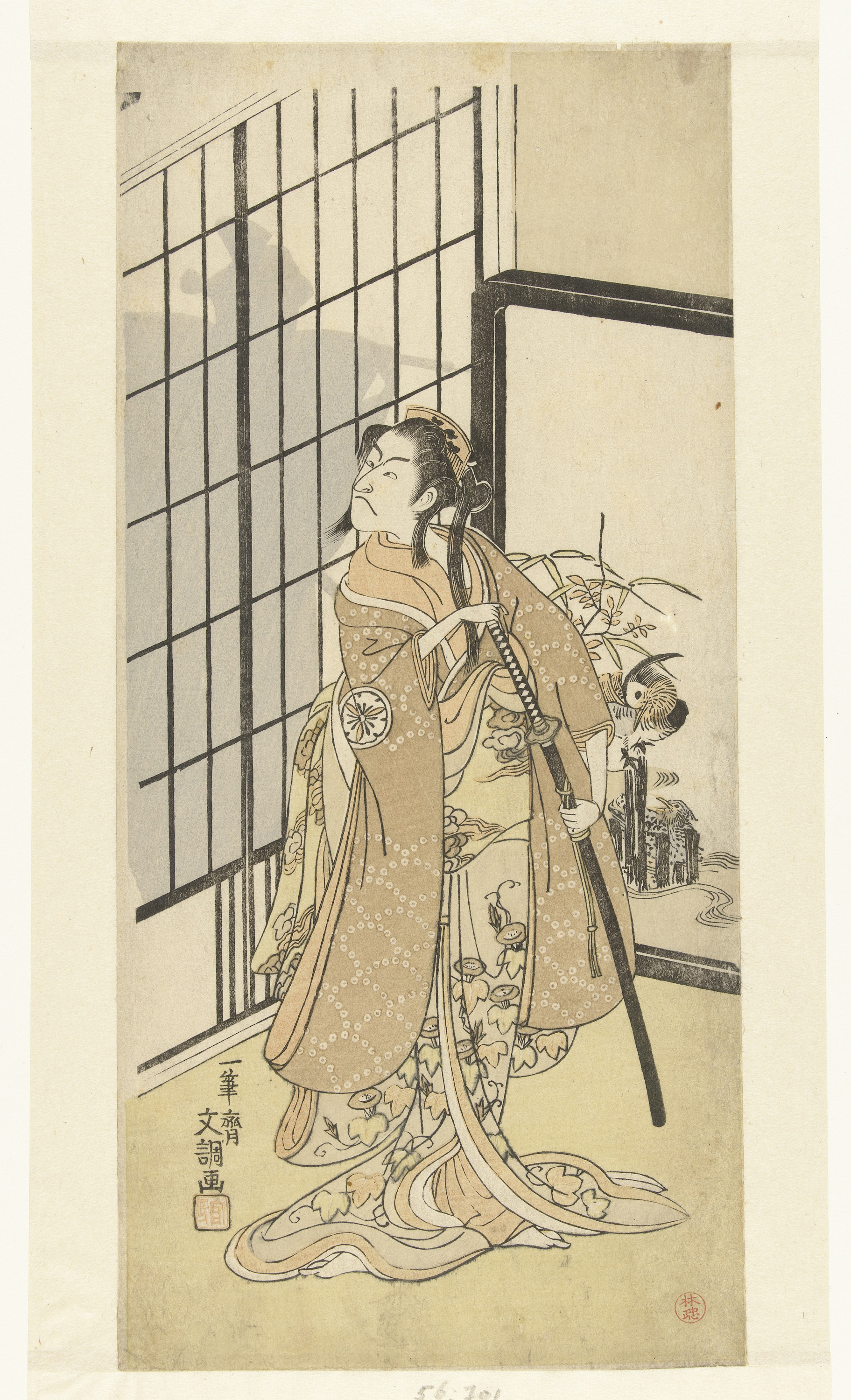
Matsumoto Koshiro as Asagao

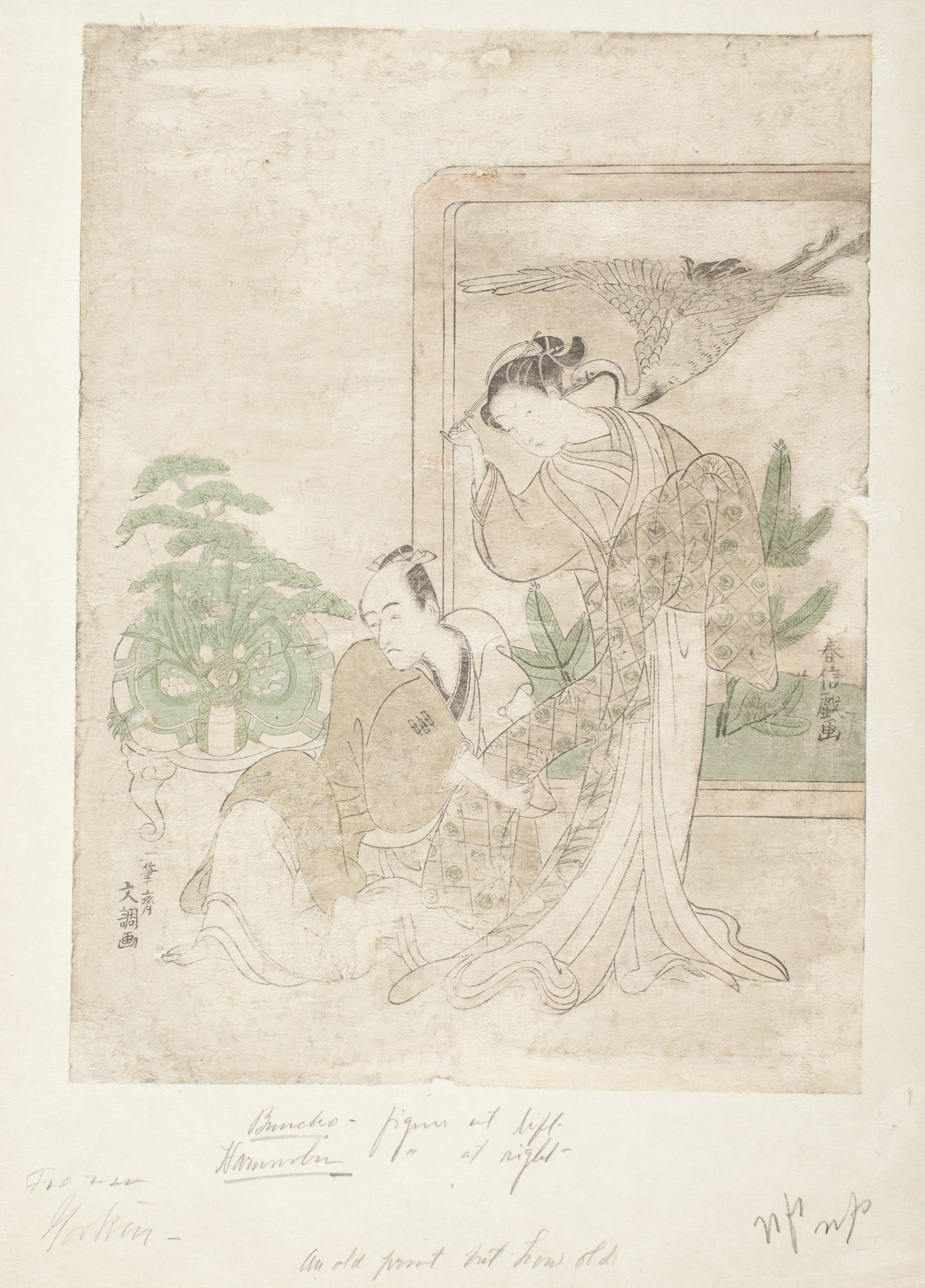
Actor and Courtesan Parodying the Armor-Pulling Scene from the Story of the Soga Brothers

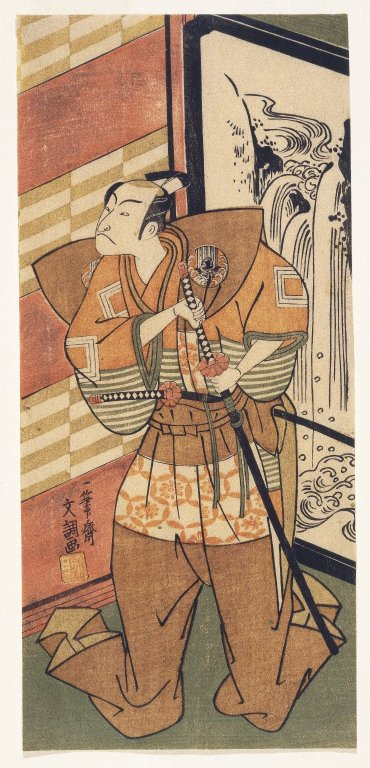
An Actor of the Ichikawa School about to Draw His Sword

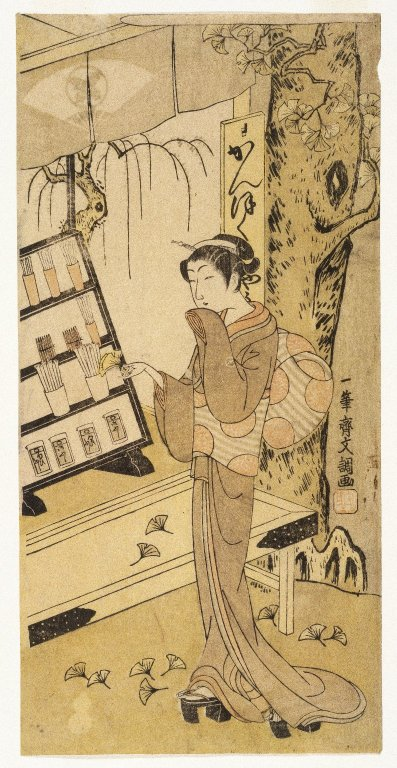
The Toothbrush Shop Yanagi-ya

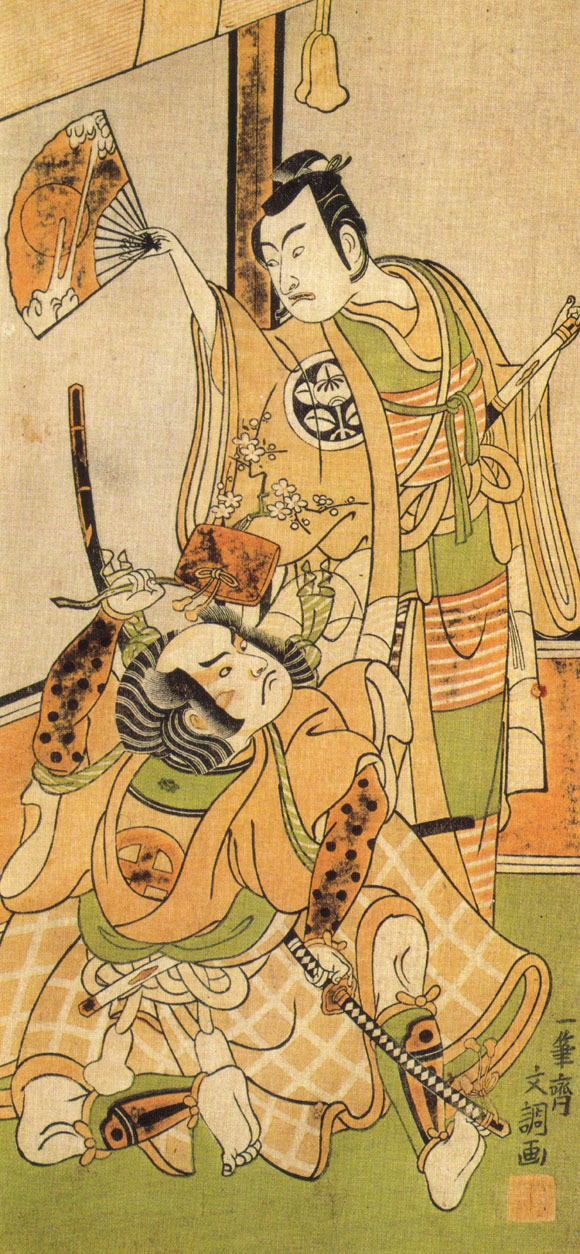
Ichimura Uzaemon IX and Otani Hiroji III

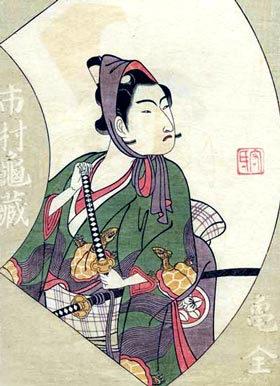
Ichimura Uzaemon X

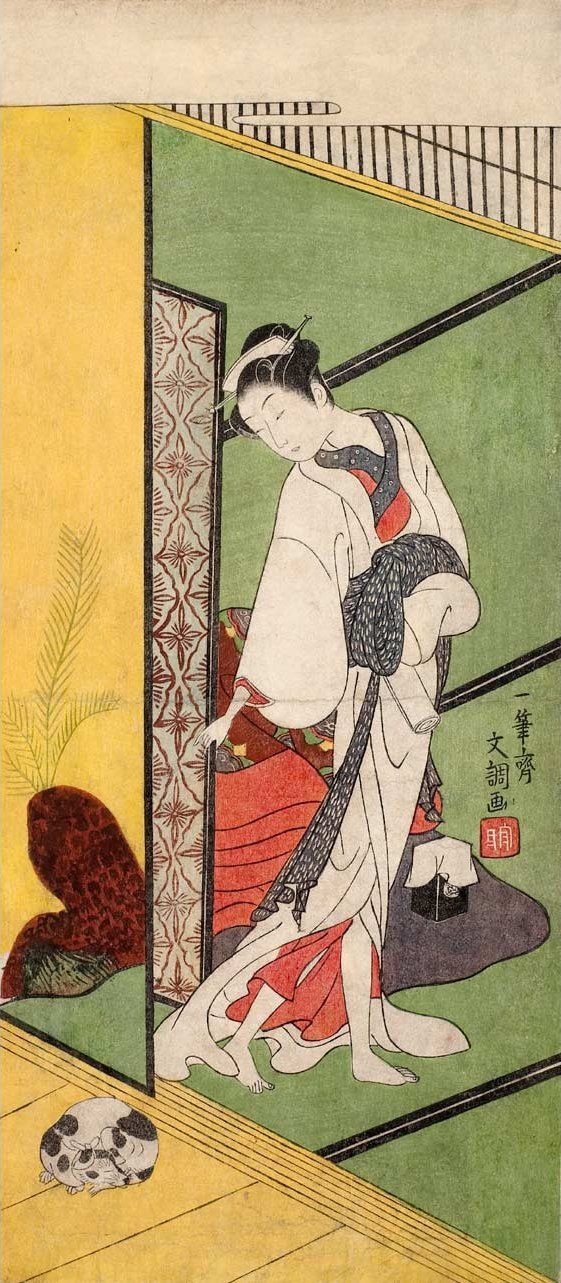
Courtesan with a Dog

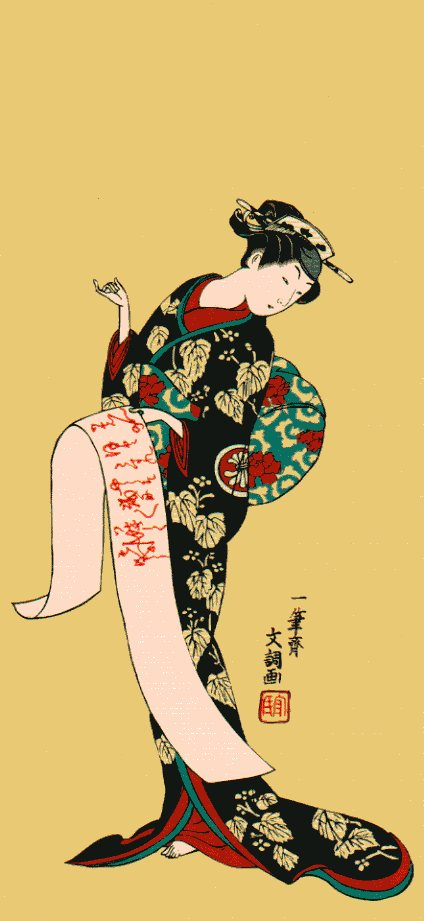
