= Ōkubi-e =

Japanese woodblock prints

An ōkubi-e (Japanese: 大首絵) is a Japanese portrait print or painting in the ukiyo-e genre showing only the head or the head and upper torso. Katsukawa Shunkō I (1743–1812) is generally credited with producing the first ōkubi-e. He, along with Katsukawa Shunshō, designed ōkubi-e of male kabuki actors. In the early-1790s, Utamaro designed the first ōkubi-e of beautiful women (bijin-ga ōkubi-e). The shogunate authorities banned ōkubi-e in 1800, but the ban was lifted after eight years.

== Gallery ==
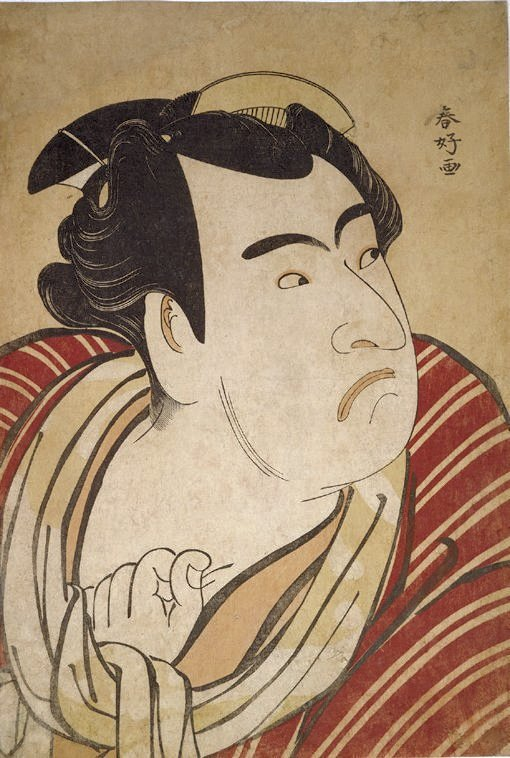
Ōkubi-e of kabuki actor Matsumoto Kōshirō IV as Tsurunosuke, a woodblock print by Katsukawa Shunkō I

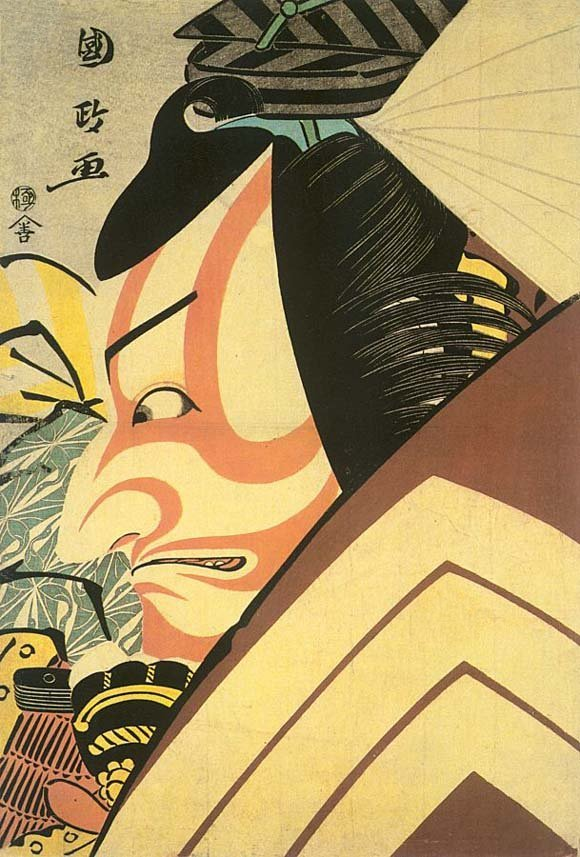
Woodblock print by Utagawa Kunimasa of kabuki actor Ichikawa Ebizō in a shibaraku role, 1796

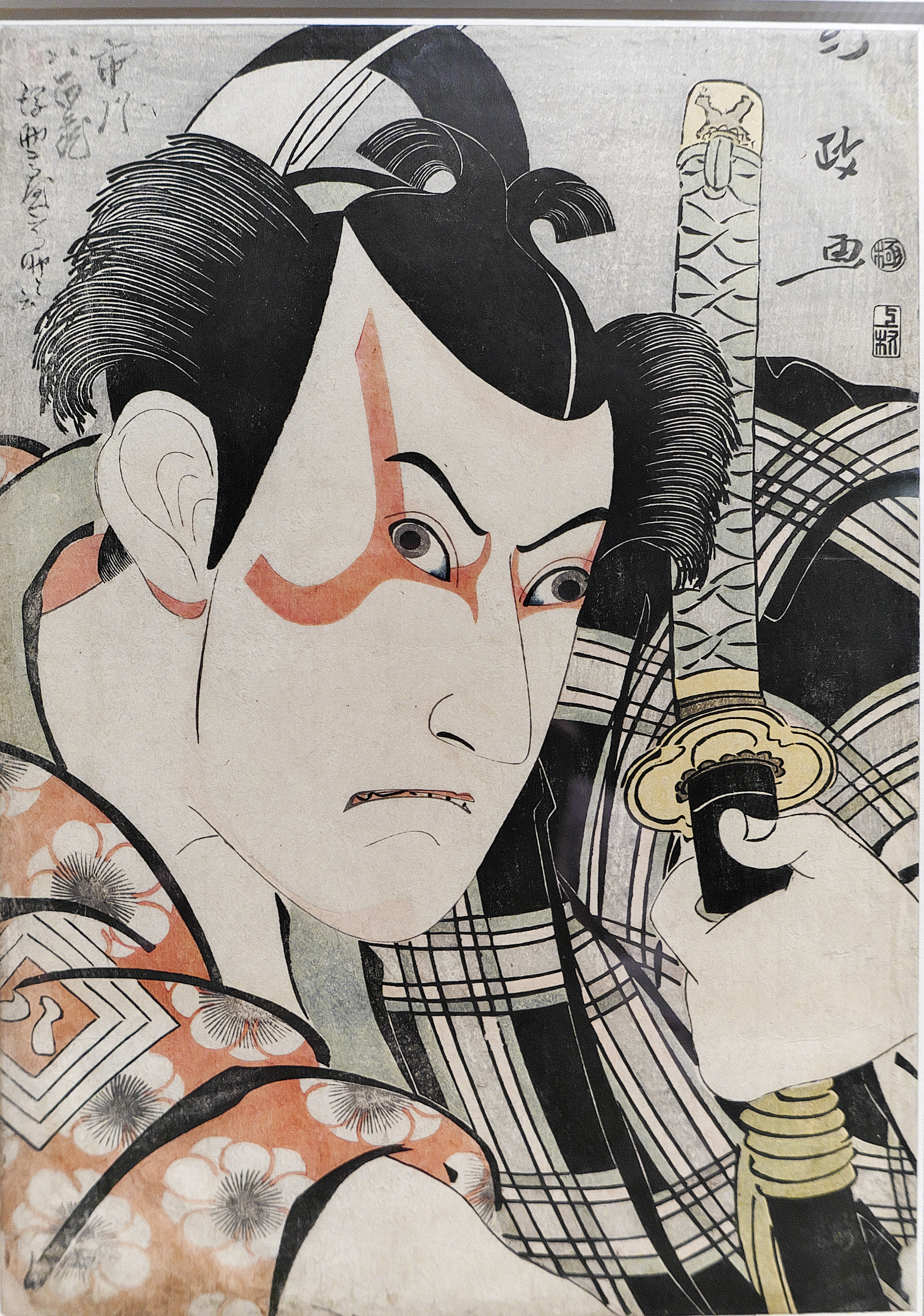
Ichikawa Yaozo III as Umeōmaru, woodblock print by Utagawa Kunimasa, 1796

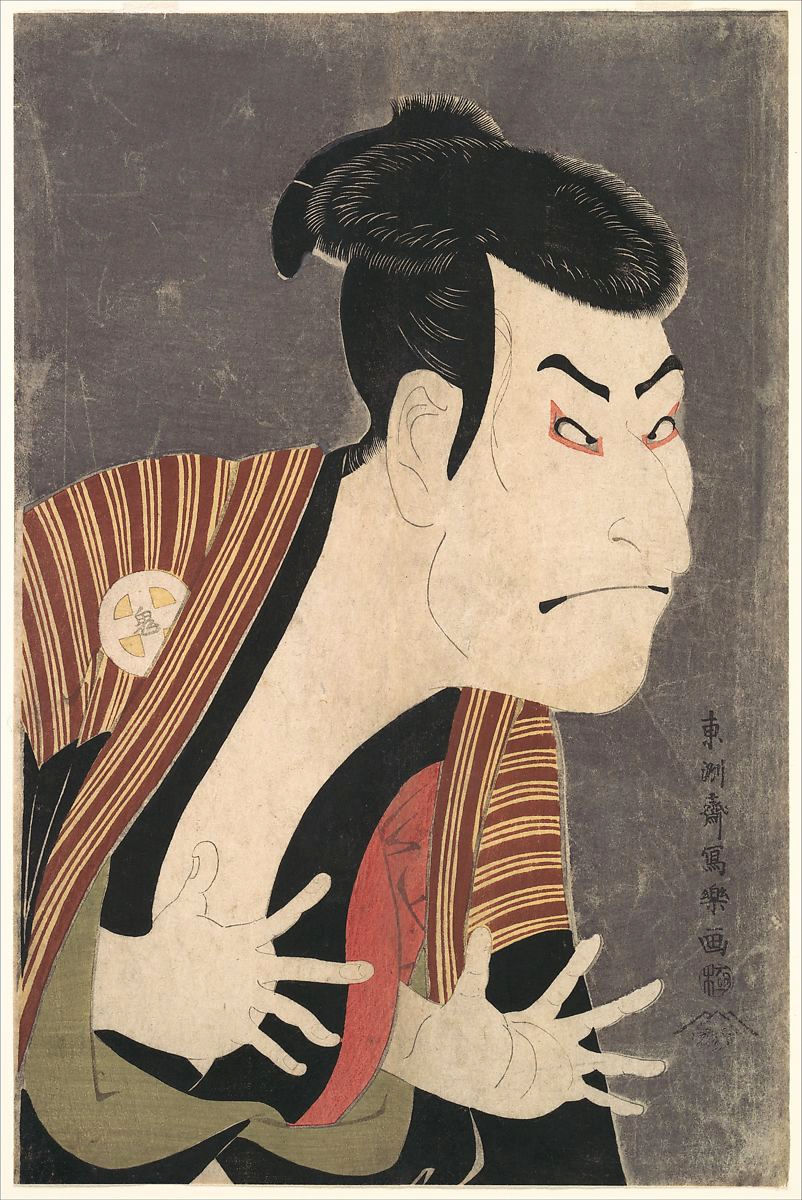
Nakazō Nakamura II as Edobee, woodblock print by Sharaku, 1794

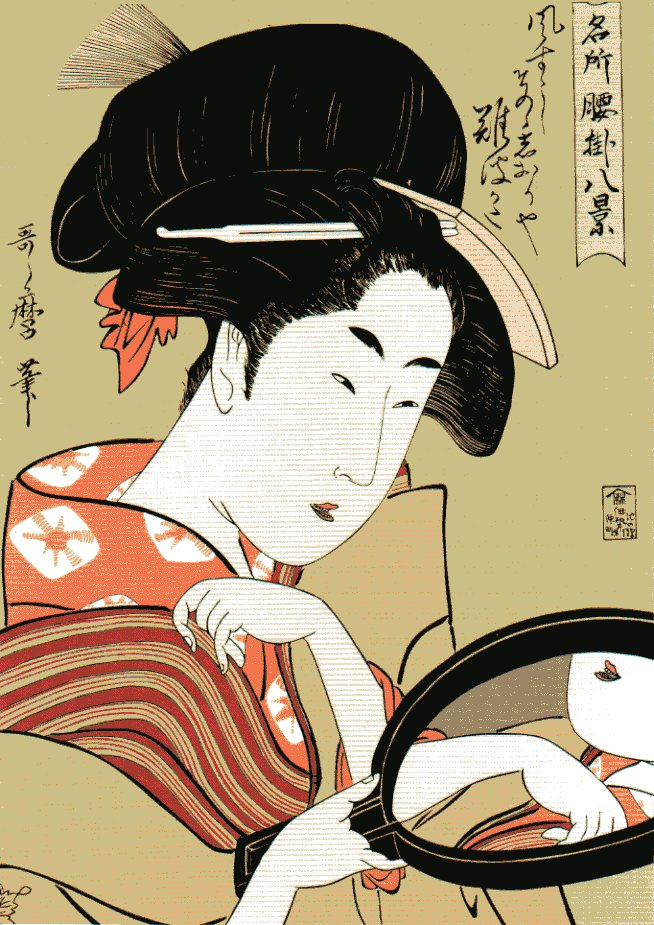
Print by Kitagawa Utamaro

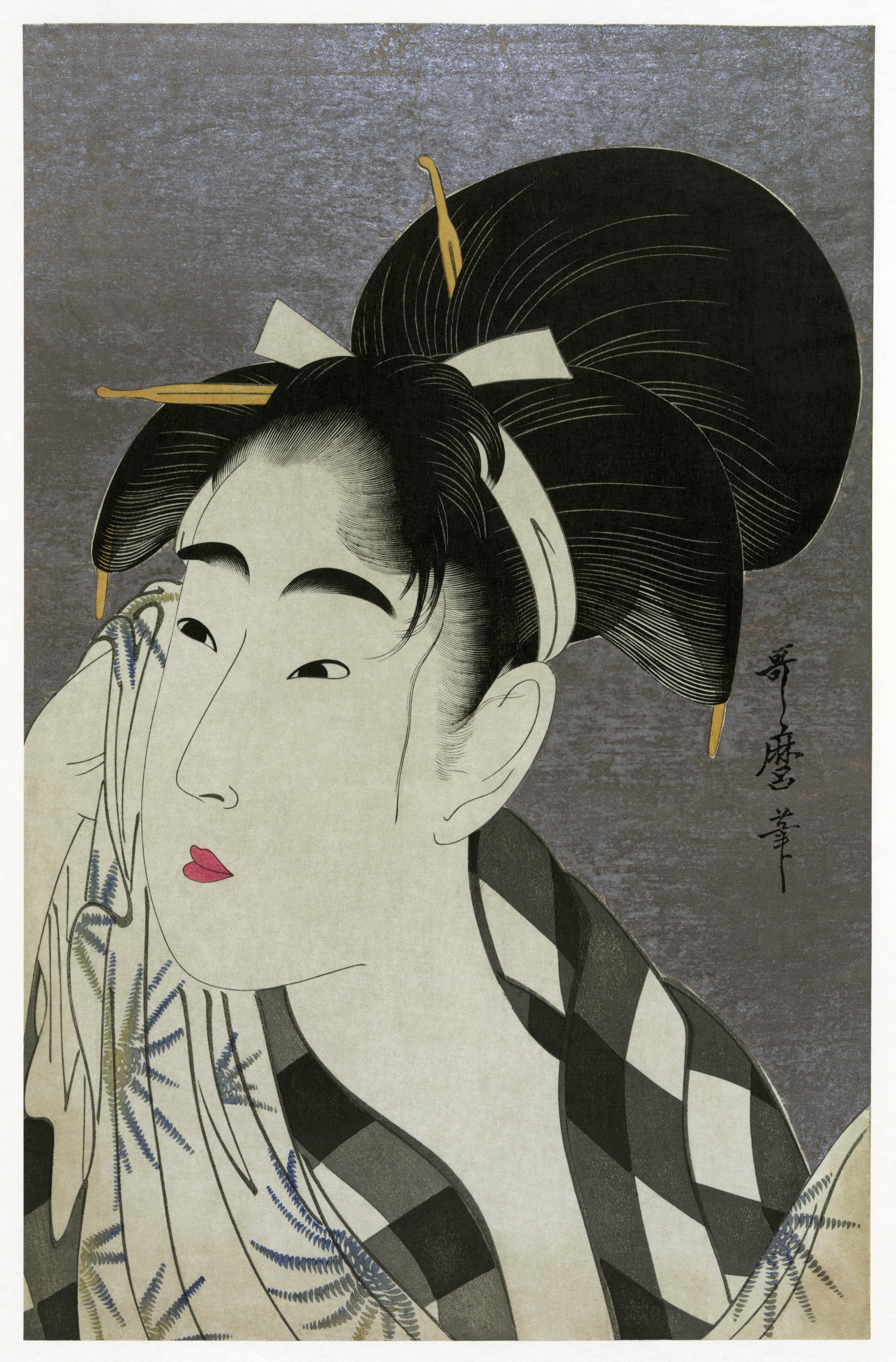
Woman Wiping Sweat, woodblock print by Utamaro, 1798

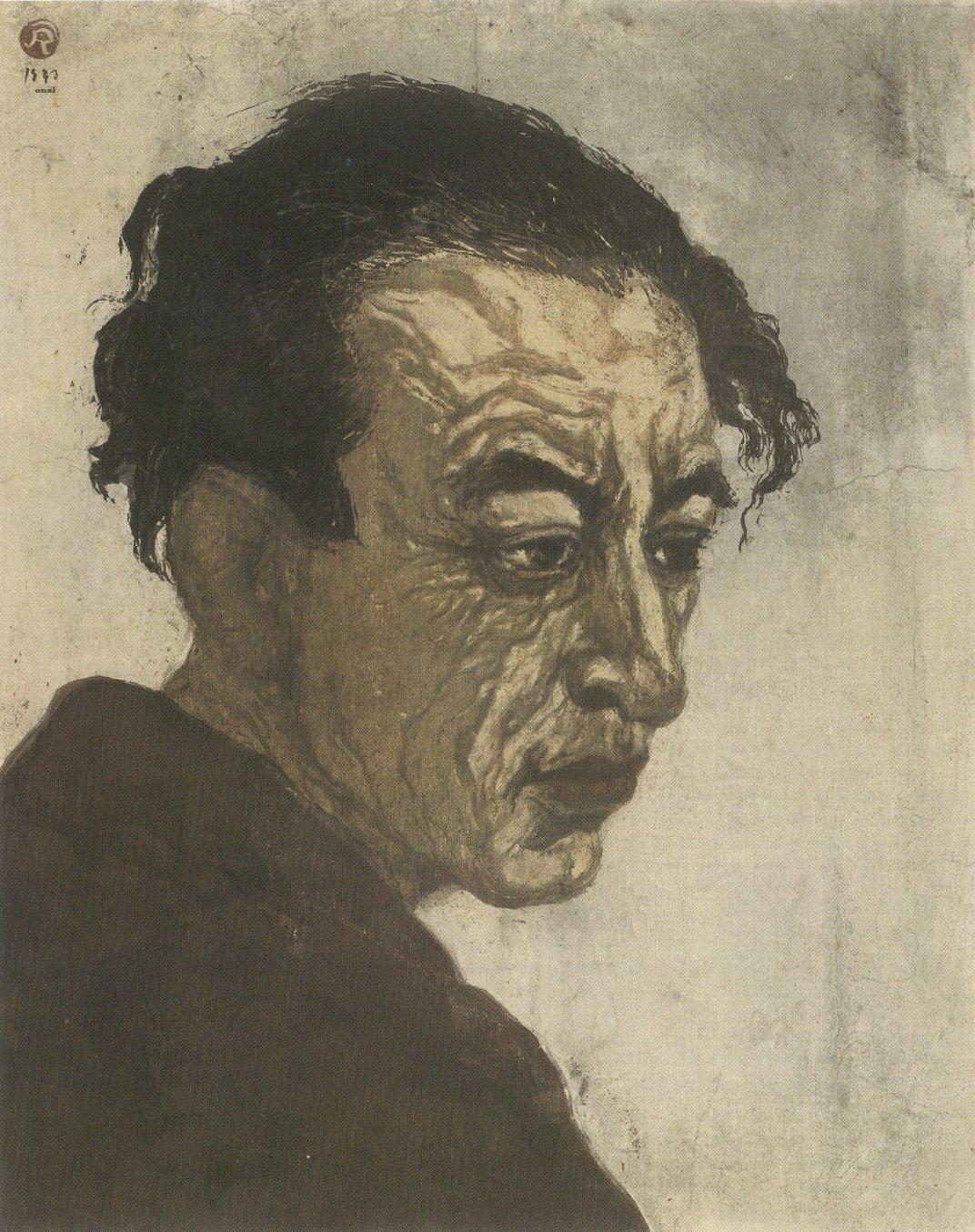
Portrait of Hagiwara Sakutarō, woodblock print by Onchi Kōshirō, 1943
