= Katsukawa Shunchō =

Japanese ukiyo-e artist

Typical signature of Katsukawa Shunchō reading “Shunchō ga” (春潮 画)

Katsukawa Shunchō (勝川 春潮) was a Japanese designer of ukiyo-e style Japanese woodblock prints, who was active from about 1783 to about 1795.

Shunchō's common name was Kichizaemon; besides "Shunchō" he used numerous gō, including Chūrin, Chūrinsha, Sankō, Shien, Tansei, Tanseidō, Tōshien and Yūshidō. In his later years he also studied under Shunman, signing his work "Kichisadō Shunchō", and at times used a seal reading "Sankō".

Although a student of Katsukawa Shunshō, Shunchō's output, which consists mostly of prints of beautiful women, more closely resembles the work of Torii Kiyonaga. Unlike Kiyonaga, already a leading artist in his own time and regarded today among the very finest of ukiyo-e, Shunchō was not himself an innovator; his prints, though often closely resembling Kiyonaga's in their almost unique harmony of colour, lack the latter's magnificence of concept, but possess in exchange a peculiar ethereal quality rarely found in Kiyonaga's work, along with a certain unsettling mystery in his depiction of women that is absent from Kiyonaga's gentler, more graceful creations. Shunchō also designed many shunga prints, which also resemble those of Torii Kiyonaga.

His work is held in the permanent collections of many museums worldwide, including the Portland Art Museum, the University of Michigan Museum of Art, the Nelson-Atkins Museum of Art, the Reading Public Museum, the Gregory Allicar Museum of Art, the Harvard Art Museums, the Minneapolis Institute of Art, the Mead Art Museum at Amherst College, the Hyde Collection, the Indianapolis Museum of Art, the Brooklyn Museum, the Suntory Museum of Art, and the Metropolitan Museum of Art.

== Gallery ==
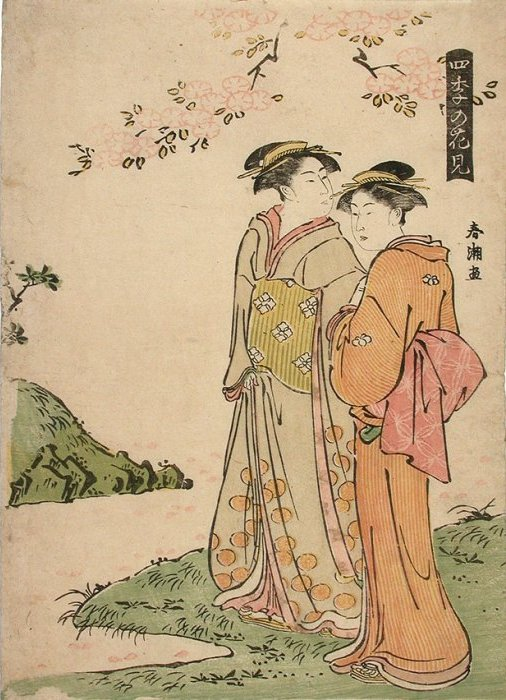
Woodblock print by Katsukawa Shunchō titled “Viewing Flowers in Four Seasons” (Shiki no hanami)

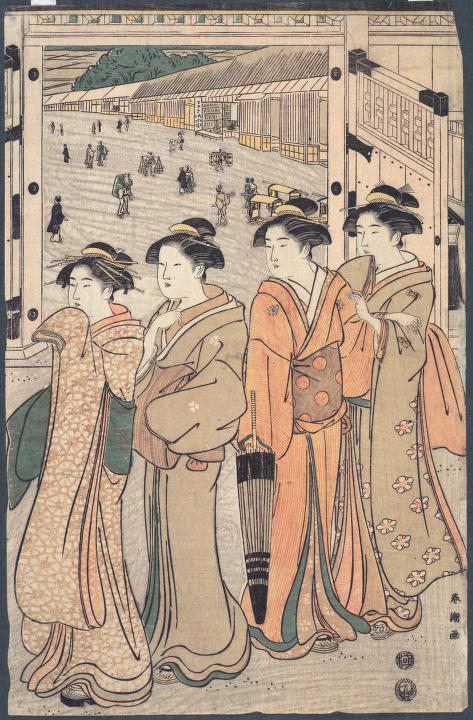
Courtesans in front of the Great Gate (Ōmon) of the Shin-Yoshiwara pleasure district, 1780s.
