= Katsukawa Shunsen =

Japanese artist (c. 1762–1830)

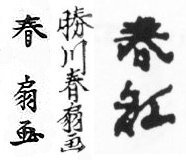
Signatures of Katsukawa Shunsen reading from left to right: “Shunsen ga” (春扇 画), “Katsukawa Shunsen ga” (勝川 春扇 画), and “Shunkō” (春好)

Katsukawa Shunsen (勝川 春扇), also known as Shunkō II, was a designer of books and ukiyo-e-style Japanese woodblock prints. He was born in 1762 and designed prints from about 1805 to about 1821. He initially studied with the Rimpa school artist Tsutsumi Tōrin III, under the name Shunrin. In 1806 or 1807, Shunsen became a student of Katsukawa Shun'ei and changed his name from “Kojimachi Shunsen” to “Katsukawa Shunsen”. In 1820 he succeeded Katsukawa Shunkō I, becoming Katsukawa Shunkō II. In the late 1820s, he ceased producing woodblock prints and devoted himself to painting ceramics. He died about 1830.

Shunsen is best known for his genre scenes, landscapes, and prints of beautiful women, produced using Western-style perspective.

== Gallery ==
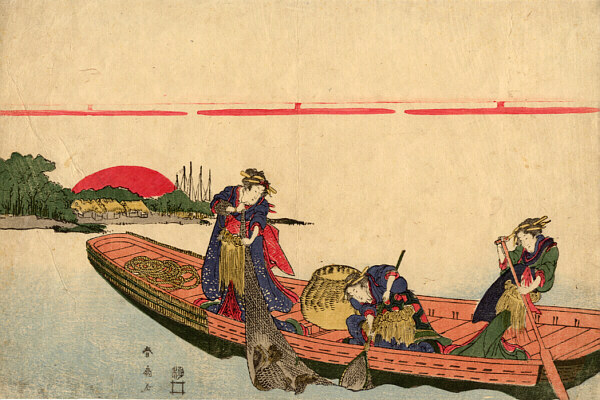
Untitled woodblock print of carp fishing
