= Katsukawa Shunshō =

Japanese artist (1726–1793)

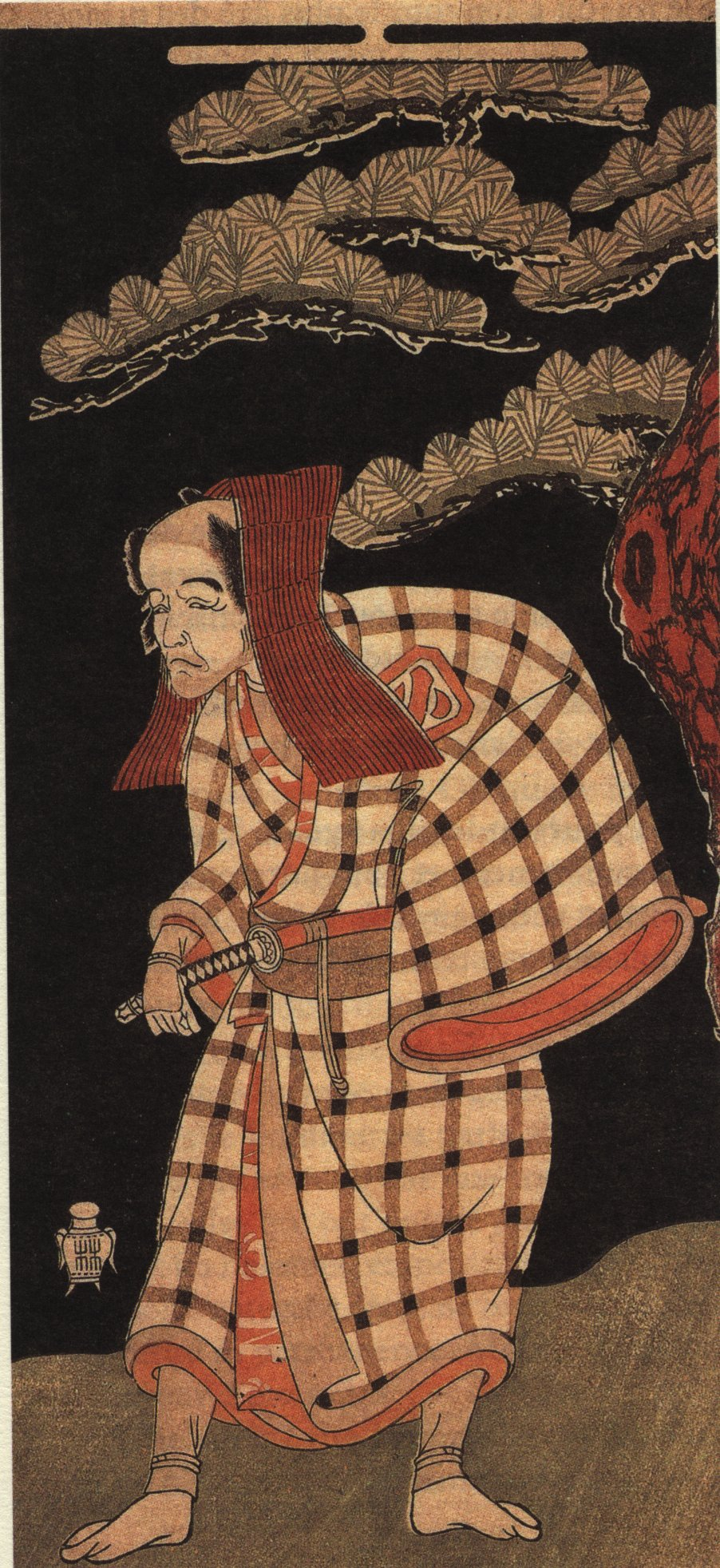
Kabuki actor, by Katsukawa Shunshō

Shunshō Katsukawa (Japanese: 勝川 春章; 1726 – 19 January 1793) was a Japanese painter and printmaker in the ukiyo-e style, and the leading artist of the Katsukawa school. Shunshō studied under Miyagawa Shunsui, son and student of Miyagawa Chōshun, both equally famous and talented ukiyo-e artists. Shunshō is best known for introducing a new form of yakusha-e, prints depicting Kabuki actors. However, his bijin-ga (images of beautiful women) paintings, while less famous, are said by some scholars to be "the best in the second half of the [18th] century".

== Biography ==
Shunshō first came to Edo to study haiku and painting. He became a noted printmaker of actors with his first works dating from 1760. Though originally a member of the Torii school, he soon broke away and began his own style, which would later be dubbed the Katsukawa school. Among his students were the famous ukiyo-e artists Shunchō, Shun'ei, and Hokusai.

In 1770 Shunshō collaborated with Ippitsusai Bunchō on Ehon Butai Ōgi, an illustrated book depicting leading kabuki actors of the day on folding fans; carved by Endō Matsugorō and published in three volumes by Kariganeya Ihei, it proved so popular that it was reprinted several times and is still regarded as one of the most important woodblock-printed books in the history of ukiyo-e, offering a clear view of the nigao-e likeness-based style of actor portraiture that both artists helped establish.

Most of Shunshō's actor prints are in the hoso-e (33 × 15 centimetres (13.0 × 5.9 in)) format common at the time, but he created a great number of works in triptych or pentaptych sets. However, what truly set his work apart from that of earlier artists was the depiction of large portrait-style heads and the insides of actors' dressing rooms. He was also one of the first to pioneer realistic depictions of actors; in Shunshō's prints, unlike in the works of the Torii school, it was possible for the first time to distinguish not only the theatrical role, but also the actor portraying that role. Shunshō also made use often of the long and narrow hashira-e format.

Though he painted many revered paintings of bijin, he produced very few prints depicting them. Seirō Bijin Awase Sugata Kagami (青楼美人合姿鏡), "A Mirror Reflecting the Forms of Fair Women of the Green-Houses"), a printed book on which he collaborated with Kitao Shigemasa, is one of the only printed works containing bijin-ga by Shunshō. His paintings not only depicted elegantly painted women and fashions, but great attention is also paid to the landscape elements and architecture of the backgrounds. Though his prints belie a strong fascination with the theatre world, his paintings suggest the complete opposite.

== Names ==
Originally Katsumiyagawa Yūsuke, "Katsukawa Shunshō" is one of many art-names (gō) taken on by the artist during his life. Others include Jūgasei, Ririn, Yūji, Kyokurōsei, and Rokurokuan. Prior to signing his works with one of these gō, he used a stamp in the shape of a gourd surrounding the character mori (森), meaning "forest"。
