= Schools of ukiyo-e artists =

Japanese art movements

Ukiyo-e artists may be organized into schools, which consist of a founding artist and those artists who were taught by or strongly influenced by him. Artists of the Osaka school are united both stylistically and geographically. Not all of these artists designed woodblock prints, and some ukiyo-e artists had more than one teacher, and others are not known to be associated with any particular school.

== Asayama school (in Osaka) ==
Asayama Ashikuni (founder)
Ashisato
Ashifune
Ashihiro
Ashikiyo
Asayama Ashitaka
Asayama Ashitomo
Gigadō Ashiyuki (Nagakuni)
Jukōdō Yoshilkuni

== Eishi school (also known as Hosoda school) ==
Chōbunsai Eishi (founder)
Ichirakute Eisui
Chōkōsai Eishō
Chōkyōsai Eiri
Gessai Gabimaru
Chōensai Eishin
Rekisentei Eiri
Harukawa Eizan

== Furuyama school ==
Furuyama Moroshige (founder)
Furuyama Moromasa
Furuyama Morotane
Furuyama Morotsugu

== Harukawa Eizan school ==
Harukawa Eizan (founder)
Harukawa Goshichi
Harukawa Eichō

== Harunobu school ==
Suzuki Harunobu (founder)
Isoda Koryūsai
Shiba Kōkan (Suzuki Harushige)
Yasunobu
Komai Yoshinobu
Suzuki Haruji
Masunobu
Mitsunobu
Naka Kuninobu
Morino Sōgyoku
Ueno Shōha

== Hasegawa school (in Osaka) ==
Hasegawa Sadanobu I (founder)
Hasegawa Sadanobu II
Hasegawa Settan

Hasegawa Settei

== Hishikawa school (also known as the Moronobu school) ==
Hishikawa Moronobu (founder)
Hishikawa Morofusa
Hishikawa Moroyoshi
Hishikawa Moronaga
Hishikawa Moroshige
Hishikawa Morohira
Tamazaki Ryūjo

== Hokusai school ==
Katsushika Hokusai (Shunrō, Sōri, Taitō)
Katsushika Ōi
Yanagawa Shigenobu

Yanagawa Nobusada (Yanagawa Yukinobu)

Hishikawa Sōri
Katsushika Hokumei
Teisai Hokuba
Maki Bokusen
Numata Gessai
Shōtei Hokuju
Totoya Hokkei
Ryūryūkyo Shinsai
Hōtei Gosei
Katsushika Hokuun
Katsushika Taito II
Katsushika Isai
Katsushika Hokui
Enkōan

== Ippitsusai Bunchō school ==
Ippitsusai Bunchō (founder)
Tsumuri no Hikaru
Tamagawa Shūchō

== Ishikawa Toyonobu school ==
Ishikawa Toyonobu (founder)
Ishikawa Toyomasa

== Kaigetsudō school ==
Kaigetsudō Ando (founder)
Kaigetsudō Anchi
Kaigetsudō Dohan
Kaigetsudō Doshin
Kaigetsudō Doshu
Kaigetsudō Doshū
Hasegawa Eishun (Baiōken Eishun)
Matsuno Chikanobu

== Katsukawa school (also known as the Shunshō school) ==
Katsukawa Shunshō (founder)
Koikawa Harumachi I
Katsukawa Shunrō
Katsukawa Shun'ei
Katsukawa Shuntei
Katsukawa Shun'en
Katsukawa Shundō II
Katsukawa Shunrin
Katsukawa Shōju
Katsukawa Shundō
Katsukawa Shunzan
Katsukawa Shunjō
Katsukawa Shunsen (Katsukawa Shunkō II)
Katsukawa Shunchō
Katsukawa Shunkō I
Katsukawa Shungyō
Tamagawa Shunsui
Kinchōdō Sekiga
Katsukawa Shunri
Katsukawa Shunwa

== Kawamata school ==
Kawamata Tsuneyuki
Kawamata Tsunemasa
Kawamata Tsunetatsu

== Keisai Eisen school ==
Keisai Eisen (founder)
Isono Bunsai
Yamatoya Sada
Teisai Senchō
Senshōtei Toyotsuru

== Kitagawa school (also known as Utamaro school) ==
Kitagawa Utamaro (founder)
Kitagawa Utamaro II
Maki Bokusen
Kitagawa Chiyojo
Kitagawa Fujimaro
Kitagawa Tsukimaro
Chōchōdō Kagenori
Kitagawa Yukimaro
Kitagawa Shikimaro
Kitagawa Yoshimaro
Eishōsai Chōki
Kitagawa Hidemaro
Juka Sekijō
Soraku
Michimaro
Chikanobu
Bunrō
Isomaro
Hishikawa Ryūkoku
Rakumaro
Minemaro
Senman

== Kitao school (also known as the Shigemasa school) ==
Kitao Shigemasa (founder)
Kitao Shigemasa II
Kubo Shunman
Kitao Masanobu
Kitao Masayoshi

== Koikawa school ==
Koikawa Harumachi I (founder)
Koikawa Harumachi II
Koikawa Harumasa
Koikawa Hakuga

== Kondō school ==
Kondō Kiyoharu (founder)
Kondō Kiyonobu
Kondō Katsunobu

== Miyagawa school ==
Miyagawa Chōshun (founder)
Miyagawa Isshō
Miyagawa Chōki
Miyagawa Shunsui

== Nishikawa school (also known as the Sukenobu school) ==
Nishikawa Sukenobu (founder)
Nishikawa Suketada
Kawashima Nobukiyo
Nishikawa Terunobu
Takagi Sadatake

== Nishimura school (also known as the Shigenaga school) ==
Nishimura Shigenaga (founder)
Ishikawa Toyonobu
Nishimura Shigenobu
Suzuki Harunobu
Yamamoto Fujinobu
Tomikawa Fusanobu
Yamamoto Yoshinobu
Hirose Shigenobu

== Okumura school (also known as the Masanobu school) ==
Okumura Masanobu (founder)
Okumura Nobufusa
Okumura Toshinobu
Tanaka Masunobu
Mangetsudō

== Ōoka school (in Osaka) ==
Ōoka Shunboku (founder)
Takehara Shunchōsai

== Osaka school ==
Ryūkōsai Jokei (founder)

Shōkōsai Hanbei

Shunkōsai Hokushū (Shunkō IV)

Ashikuni
Ashiyuki (Nagakuni)
Enjaku
Yoshida Hanbei
Hikokuni
Hironobu
Hirosada I

Hirosada II

Shunbaisai Hokuei (Shunkō III)
Hokumyō
Kagematsu
Kikyo
Kiyosada
Kunihiro
Kunikazu
Kunimasu (Sadamasu)
Kunishige
Mitsukuni
Munehiro
Nagahide
Nobukatsu
Yanagawa Nobusada
Sadahiro I
Sadahiro II
Sadanobu I
Sadanobu II
Sadayoshi
Shigefusa
Shigeharu
Shigenobu
Shunkyō
Shunshi
Shunshō
Shûshō
Tokusai
Toyohide
Utakuni
Yoshifune
Yoshikuni I
Yoshikuni II
Yoshitaki
Yoshiume
Yoshiyuki

== Ryūkōsai school (in Osaka) ==
Ryūkōsai Jokei (founder)
Shōkōsai Hanbei
Urakusai Nagahide

== Shigenobu school ==
Yanagawa Shigenobu I (founder)
Yanagawa Shigenobu II
Tōrōsai Shigemitsu

== Shunkōsai Fukushū school (in Osaka) ==
Shunkōsai Fukushū (founder)
Shunshosai Hokuchō
Gatōken Shunshi
Shunbaisai Hokuei (Shunkō III)
Seiyōsai Shunshi

== Torii school ==
Torii Kiyomoto (founder)
Torii Kiyonobu I (co-founder)
Torii Kiyonobu II
Torii Kiyomasu I
Torii Kiyomasu II
Torii Kiyomitsu I
Torii Kiyotsune
Torii Kiyohiro
Torii Kiyosato
Torii Kiyonaga
Torii Kiyomasa I
Torii Kiyomine I
Hanegawa Chinchō
Kondō Kiyoharu
Torii Kiyotada
Katsukawa Terushige
Torii Kiyotomo
Torii Kiyoshige I
Torii Kotondo

== Toyohara school ==
Toyohara Kunichika (founder)
Yōshū Chikanobu (Toyohara Chikanobu)
Watanabe Nobukazu
Toyohara Chikaharu
Morikawa Chikashige
Toyohara Chikayoshi
Toyohara Chikasato

== Utagawa school ==
Utagawa Toyoharu (founder)
Utagawa Toyohiro
Utagawa Hirochika II
Utagawa Toyokuni I

Utagawa Kunimasa
Utagawa Kunisada (Toyokuni III)

Utagawa Kunisada II
Utagawa Kunisada III
Utagawa Sadahide
Utagawa Sadakage
Utagawa Sadafusa
Utagawa Fusatane
Utagawa Sadahiro
Utagawa Kuniteru II
Utagawa Kunimasu I (Sadamasu)
Utagawa Sadayoshi
Utagawa Kunihisa II
Utagawa Kunichika
Utagawa Kuniaki I
Utagawa Kuniaki II
Utagawa Kunimasa IV
Utagawa Kokunimasa
Utagawa Kunisato
Utagawa Kunitoshi

Utagawa Toyokuni II (Toyoshige)

Utagawa Kunitsuru
Utagawa Kunimatsu
Utagawa Kuniteru III

Utagawa Kunimaru
Utagawa Kuniyasu
Utagawa Kuninao
Utagawa Kuniyoshi

Utagawa Yoshimune
Utagawa Yoshiume
Utagawa Yoshitsuya
Utagawa Yoshifuji
Utagawa Yoshiharu
Utagawa Yoshitoyo
Utagawa Yoshimori
Utagawa Yoshimasa
Utagawa Yoshitora
Kawanabe Kyōsai

Hayakawa Shōzan

Utagawa Yoshiiku

Kobayashi Ikuhide

Utagawa Yoshitama
Utagawa Yoshifusa
Utagawa Yoshitoshi
Utagawa Yoshikata
Utagawa Yoshikatsu
Utagawa Yoshijo
Utagawa Yoshinobu
Utagawa Yoshitorijo
Utagawa Yoshitsuna
Utagawa Yoshitsuru
Utagawa Yoshikazu
Utagawa Yoshitomi

Utagawa Kunikiyo
Utagawa Kunihisa
Utagawa Kunitora
Utagawa Kuniteru I
Utagawa Kunihiro
Ryusai Shigeharu
Utagawa Kunikage
Utagawa Kuninaga

Utagawa Hiroshige (Andō Hiroshige)

Utagawa Hiroshige II (Shigenobu)
Utagawa Hiroshige III
Risshō II
Shōsai Ikkei
Utagawa Shigemaru
Utagawa Shigekiyo
Utagawa Hirokage

== Artists not associated with a particular school ==
Kanbun Master
Sharaku
Sawa Sekkyō
Setsuri
Toriyama Sekien
Ogata Gekkō
Sugimura Jihei
Kobayashi Kiyochika
Kikukawa Eizan
