= List of painters by name beginning with "Y" =

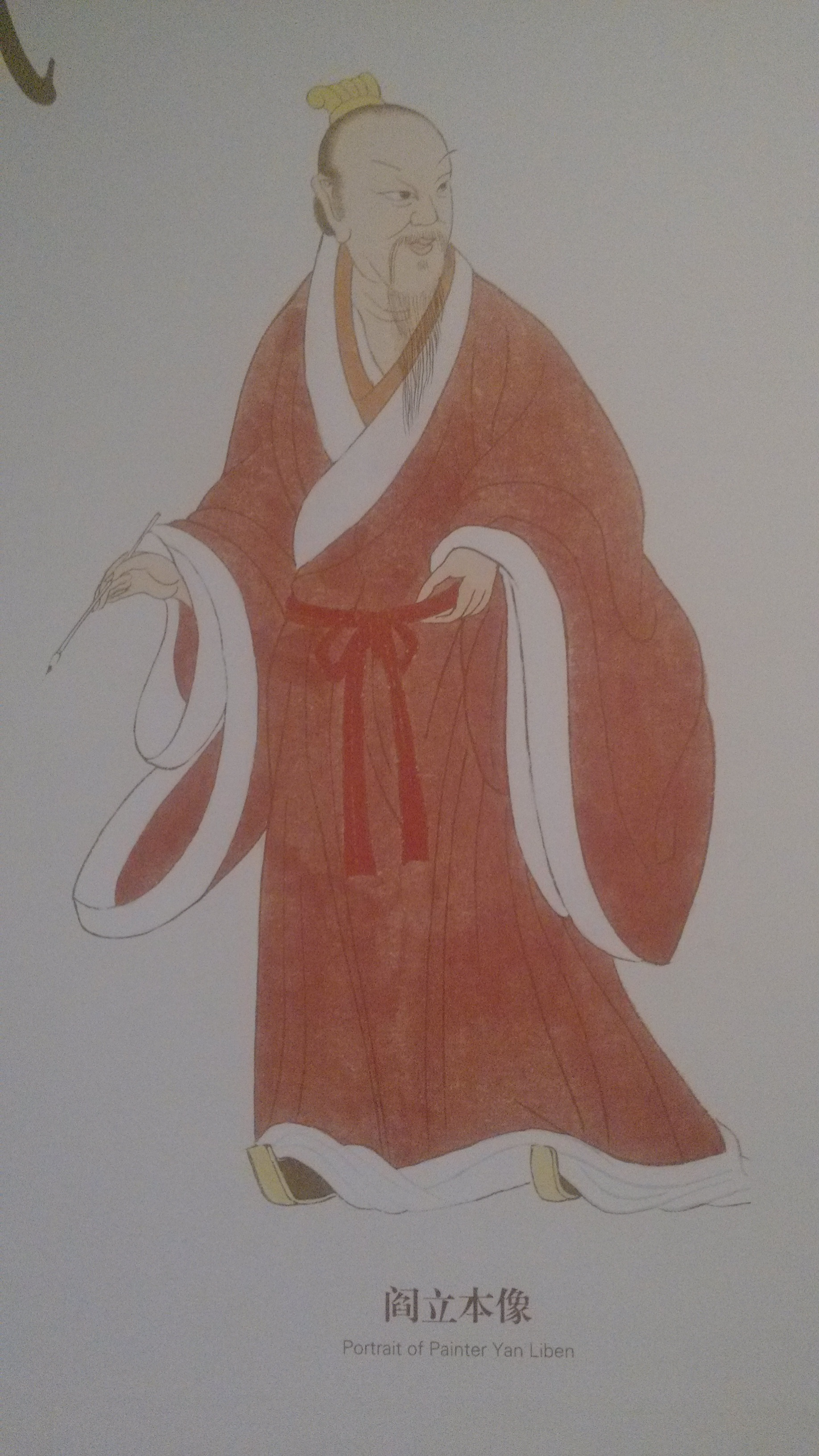
Yan Liben

Please add names of notable painters with a Wikipedia page, in precise English alphabetical order, using U.S. spelling conventions. Country and regional names refer to where painters worked for long periods, not to personal allegiances.

- Ahmed Yacoubi (1931–1985), Moroccan painter and story-teller
- Saul Yaffie (1898–1957), Scottish artist
- Yamagata Hiro (山形博導, born 1948), Japanese artist
- Yamaguchi Kayo (山口華楊, 1899–1984), Japanese nihonga painter
- Yamamoto Shōun (山本昇雲, 1870–1965), Japanese print designer, painter and illustrator
- Taro Yamamoto (1919–1994), American artist
- Kiyoshi Yamashita (山下清, 1922–1971), Japanese artist
- Tsuruko Yamazaki (山崎つる子, 1925–2019), Japanese visual artist
- Yan Hui (顏輝, fl. late 13th century), Chinese painter
- Yan Liben (閻立本, 600–673), Chinese painter, administrator and politician
- Yanagawa Nobusada (柳川信貞, fl. 1822–1832), Japanese ukiyo-e woodblock print-maker
- Yanagawa Shigenobu (柳川重信, 1787–1832), Japanese ukiyo-e artist
- Yang Borun (楊伯潤, 1837–1911), Chinese painter, calligrapher and poet
- Yang Buzhi (1098–1167), Chinese ink painter
- Yang Jin (楊晉, 1644–1728), Chinese painter
- Yang Weizhen (楊維楨, 1296–1370), Chinese painter and calligrapher
- Yao Tingmei (姚廷美, fl. late 13th or 14th century), Chinese painter
- Nikolai Yaroshenko (1846–1898), Russian painter
- Yukihiko Yasuda (安田靫彦, 1884–1978), Japanese painter
- Sōtarō Yasui (安井曾太郎, 1888–1955), Japanese painter
- Ye Xin (葉欣, fl. 17th, 18th or 19th century), Chinese painter
- Jack Butler Yeats (1871–1957), Irish artist
- William Yellowlees (1796–1855), Scottish painter
- Mary Agnes Yerkes (1886–1989), American painter, photographer and artisan
- Yi Chaegwan (이재관, 1783–1837), Korean painter
- Yi Inmun (이인문, 1745–1821), Korean court painter
- Yi Insang (이인상, 1710–1760), Korean painter and government officer
- Yi Yuanji (易元吉, c. 1000 – c. 1064), Chinese painter
- Delmer J. Yoakum (1915–1996), American painter, designer and screen-printer
- Joseph Yoakum (1886–1972), American artist
- Yokoyama Taikan (横山大観, 1868–1958), Japanese nihonga painter
- Tetsugoro Yorozu (萬鉄五郎, 1885–1927), Japanese painter
- Yosa Buson (与謝蕪村, 1716–1783), Japanese painter and poet
- Jiro Yoshihara (吉原治良, 1905–1972), Japanese painter
- Chizuko Yoshida (吉田千鶴子, 1924–2017), Japanese artist
- Yoshida Hanbei (吉田半兵衛, fl. 1664–1689), Japanese ukiyo-e illustrator
- Hiroshi Yoshida (吉田博, 1876–1950), Japanese painter and woodblock print-maker
- Tōshi Yoshida (吉田遠志, 1911–1995), Japanese print-maker
- Gertrude Ann Youse (died 1994), American painter
- Yu Zhiding (禹之鼎, 1647–1709), Chinese painter
- Yuan Jiang (袁江, fl. 1722–1735), Chinese imperial painter
- Yuan Yao (袁耀, fl. 17th, 18th or 19th century), Chinese painter
- Yue Minjun (岳敏君, born 1962), Chinese painter, sculptor and print-maker
- Yun Tusŏ (윤두서, 1668–1715), Korean painter and scholar
- Yun Shouping (惲壽平, 1633–1690), Chinese painter
- Konstantin Yuon (1875–1958), Russian painter and theater designer
- Lisa Yuskavage (born 1962), American painter
