= Eizan =

Eizan is a Japanese name that may refer to:

- Eizan Cable, a Japanese railroad
- Eizan Electric Railway, a Japanese railway company
- Harukawa Eizan, an ukiyo-e artist active in the 1790s
- Kikukawa Eizan (1787–1867), an ukiyo-e artist
