= Furuyama =

Furuyama (written: 古山) is a Japanese surname. Notable people with the surname include:

- Ichiro Furuyama (古山 一郎, 1907–?), Japanese discus thrower
- Furuyama Moromasa (古山 師政), 18th-century Japanese ukiyo-e painter
- Yukio Furuyama (古山 征男, born 1938), Japanese equestrian

== See also ==
- 16759 Furuyama, a main-belt asteroid
