= Nobusada =

Nobusada is a masculine Japanese given name. Notable people with the name include:

- Obata Nobusada (1534–1582), Japanese general
- Yanagawa Nobusada, Japanese ukiyo-e artist

== See also ==
- Nobutada
