= Yukinobu =

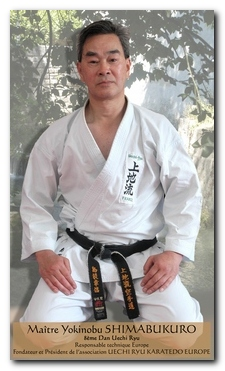
- Yukinobu Shimabukuro. Japanese karateka.
- Pronunciation: jɯkʲinobɯ (IPA)
- Gender: Male

Origin
- Origin: Japanese
- Meaning: Different meanings depending on the kanji used

Other names
- Alternative spelling: Yukinobu (Kunrei-shiki) Yukinobu (Nihon-shiki) Yukinobu (Hepburn)

Yukinobu is a masculine Japanese given name.

== Written forms ==
Yukinobu can be written using different combinations of kanji characters. Here are some examples:

- 幸信, "happiness, believe"
- 幸伸, "happiness, extend"
- 幸延, "happiness, extend"
- 行信, "to go, believe"
- 行伸, "to go, extend"
- 行延, "to go, extend"
- 之信, "of, believe"
- 之伸, "of, extend"
- 之宣, "of, announce"
- 志信, "determination, believe"
- 志伸, "determination, extend"
- 志延, "determination, extend"
- 恭信, "respectful, believe"
- 恭伸, "respectful, extend"
- 雪信, "snow, believe"

The name can also be written in hiragana ゆきのぶ or katakana ユキノブ.

== Notable people with the name ==
- Yukinobu Hoshino (星野 之宣; born 1954), Japanese manga artist
- Yukinobu Ike (池 透暢, born 1980), Japanese paralympic athlete
- Yukinobu Kiyohara (清原 雪信, 1643–1682), Kanō-school artist, and niece and apprentice to Kanō Tan'yū
- Yukinobu Nanbu (南部 行信, 1642–1702), Japanese daimyō
- Yukinobu Tatsu (龍幸伸) Japanese manga artist.
- Yukinobu Yanagawa (柳川 雪信, birth and death unknown), Japanese ukiyo-e artist
