= Chōshū =

Chōshū may refer to:

- Nagato Province
- Urakusai Nagahide, a designer of ukiyo-e style Japanese woodblock prints
- Chōshū Domain, a feudal domain of Japan during the Edo period
- Koriki Chōshū (born 1972), a Japanese comedian
- Riki Chōshū (born 1951), a Korean-Japanese professional wrestler
