= Takeda Harunobu =

Takeda Harunobu may refer to two figures in Japanese history:

- Takeda Shingen (1521–1573), Sengoku period daimyō known as Takeda Harunobu early in life
- Baiōken Eishun (active c. 1710 – 1755), ukiyo-e painter of the Kaigetsudō school; used Takeda Harunobu as one of many art-names throughout his career

== See also ==
- Suzuki Harunobu (1724–1770), prominent ukiyo-e artist frequently referred to simply as Harunobu; no connection to the name Takeda
