= Chikanobu =

Chikanobu is a Japanese name which can apply to a number of artists of the Edo period:

- Kanō Chikanobu (狩野 周信; 1660–1728), of the Kanō school
- Kitagawa Chikanobu (fl. early 19th century), student of Utamaro
- Matsuno Chikanobu (松野 親信; fl. 1720s), of the Kaigetsudō school
- Toyohara Chikanobu (豊原 周延; 1838–1912), of the Utagawa school
