= Harukawa =

Harukawa (春川) is a Japanese surname. People with this surname include:

- Harukawa Eizan (春川 栄山, fl. 1790s), Japanese woodblock print artist
- Masumi Harukawa (春川ますみ, born 1935), Japanese actress
- Namio Harukawa (春川 ナミオ, 1947–2020), pseudonym of a Japanese erotica artist

Fictional characters with this surname include:

- Maki Harukawa (春川 魔姫), character in 2017 video game Danganronpa V3
- Sora Harukawa (春川宙), character in Ensemble Stars!
