= Nagakuni =

Nagakuni (長国) is a Japanese name that may refer to:

- Nagakuni, also known as Gigadō Ashiyuki, a Japanese designer of ukiyo-e art
- Niwa Nagakuni (1834–1904), a Japanese daimyō
