= Gatōken Shunshi =

19th-century Japanese ukiyo-e artist

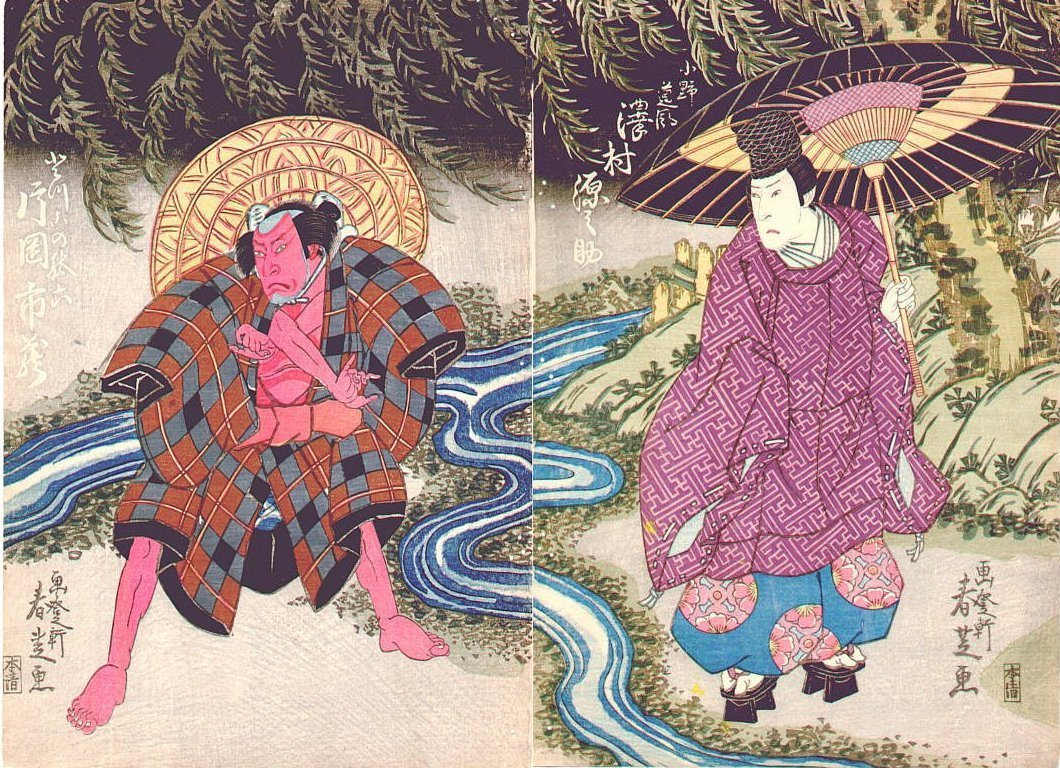
Woodblock diptych by Gatōken Shunshi showing Sawamura Gennosuke II as Ono no Tofu (right) and Kataoka Ichizō I as Tokko no Daroku (left) in the kabuki play Ono no Tofu Aoyagi Suzuri

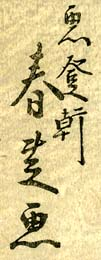
Signature of Gatōken Shunshi reading “Gatōken Shunshi ga” (画登軒 春芝 画)

Gatōken Shunshi (画登軒 春芝) was a designer of ukiyo-e Japanese woodblock prints in Osaka who was active from about 1820 to 1828. He was a student of Shunkōsai Hokushū and the teacher of Gakōken Shunshi. Gatōken Shunshi is best known for his portraits of the kabuki actors, especially the star Onoe Tamizō II.

Gatōken Shunshi was a student of Shunkōsai Hokushū, and the apparent leader of a subgroup of followers that included at least two other artists signing with the name Shunshi, written with different characters. He specialised in portraits of the actor Onoe Tamizō II, the son of a theatrical wig-maker, a skilled dancer known for a versatile, somewhat clownish stage persona owing to his short, stocky build and his limited education, presumably including illiteracy; despite this, Tamizō enjoyed a long career and a devoted following in the chū-shibai, Osaka's secondary theatres. When the young Tamizō returned to Osaka in 1823 after a three-year absence spent training under Onoe Kikugorō III in Edo, a number of artists working in nearly identical styles within Shunshi's circle began to feature him prominently in their prints.

== Other artists named Shunshi ==
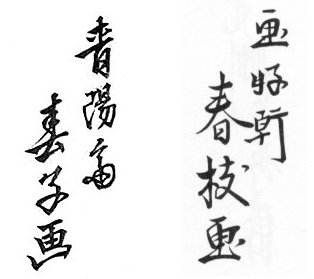
Signatures of other artists named Shunshi from left to right: “Seiyōsai Shunshi ga” (青陽齋 春子 画) and “Gakōken Shunshi ga”( 画好軒 春枝 画)

There are three other, less well known, ukiyo-e artists called “Shunshi” in English, although each is written with different kanji:

- 春子 Seiyōsai Shunshi, also known as Shun’yōsai Shunshi, active 1826–8. Possibly an early name of Hokumyō.
- 春枝 Gakōken Shunshi, a student of Gatōken Shunshi, active in the mid-1820s
- 春始 a student of Gatōken Shunshi, active in the 1830s
