= Katsukawa Shunkō I =

Japanese ukiyo-e artist

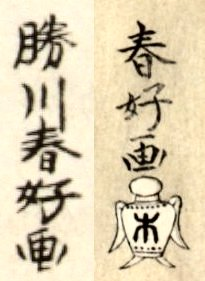
Signatures of Katsukawa Shunkô I reading from left to right: “Katsukawa Shunkô ga” (勝川 春 好 画), and “Shunkô ga” (春 好 画) with jar-shaped seal

Katsukawa Shunkō I (Japanese: 勝川 春好; 1743 – 1 December 1812) was a Japanese artist who designed ukiyo-e-style woodblock prints and paintings in Edo (modern Tokyo). He was a student of Katsukawa Shunshō, and is generally credited with designing the first large-head actor portraits (ōkubi-e). As his teacher did, Shunkō used a jar-shaped seal and was known as kotsubo ("little jar"). At 45, the right-handed Shunkō became partially paralyzed and ceased designing prints, although he continued producing paintings with his left hand.

== Life and career ==
Shunkō lived in Nihonbashi Hasegawachō in Edo (modern Tokyo) and was a student of Katsukawa Shunshō—possibly the master's first. Shunkō's surname was Kiyokawa, and his personal name was Denjirō. His earliest known work are the illustrations to the book Talks about Debut Plays (Kaomise shibai banashi, 1766). From about 1771, he began to design yakusha-e actor prints, which he signed with a small jar-shaped seal that appeared next to a larger one by his master; from this he earned the nickname Kotsubo ("small jar"). His earliest known single-sheet print appears to be a hosoban dated February 1771, depicting the actors Ichimura Uzaemon IX as Soga no Gorō and Nakajima Mihoemon II as Asahina Saburō in Wada Sakamori Osame no Mitsugumi at Edo's Ichimura-za theatre.

During the 1770s and 1780s, most of Shunkō's prints appeared in the tall, narrow hosoban format. In 1788 he began to produce bust portraits of actors, a style that was to become popular in the 1790s and has come to be associated with the works of Sharaku. Other subjects Shunkō depicted include sumo wrestlers.

Shunkō suffered a stroke at the close of the 1780s that deprived him of the use of his right arm. He gave up designing prints and devoted himself to painting. He died in 1812 at age 70 and was buried at Zenshōji temple in Asakusa. His Buddhist posthumous name is Shaku Shunkō Shinji.

== Gallery ==
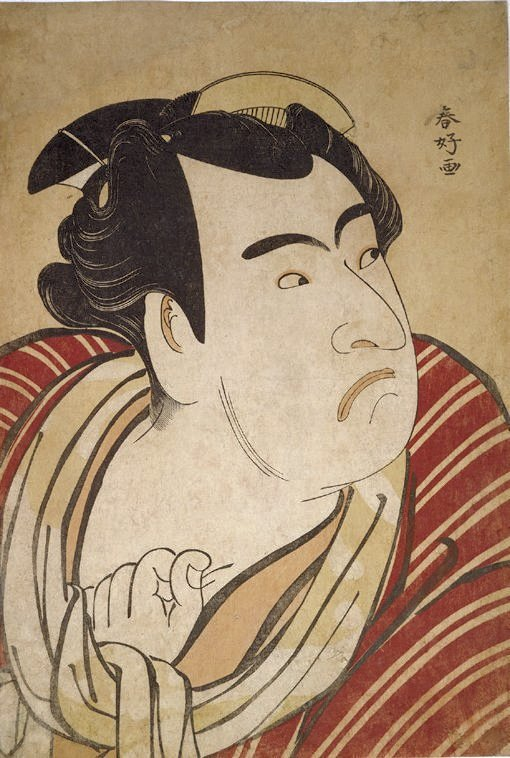
Matsumoto Kōshirō IV as Tsurunosuke

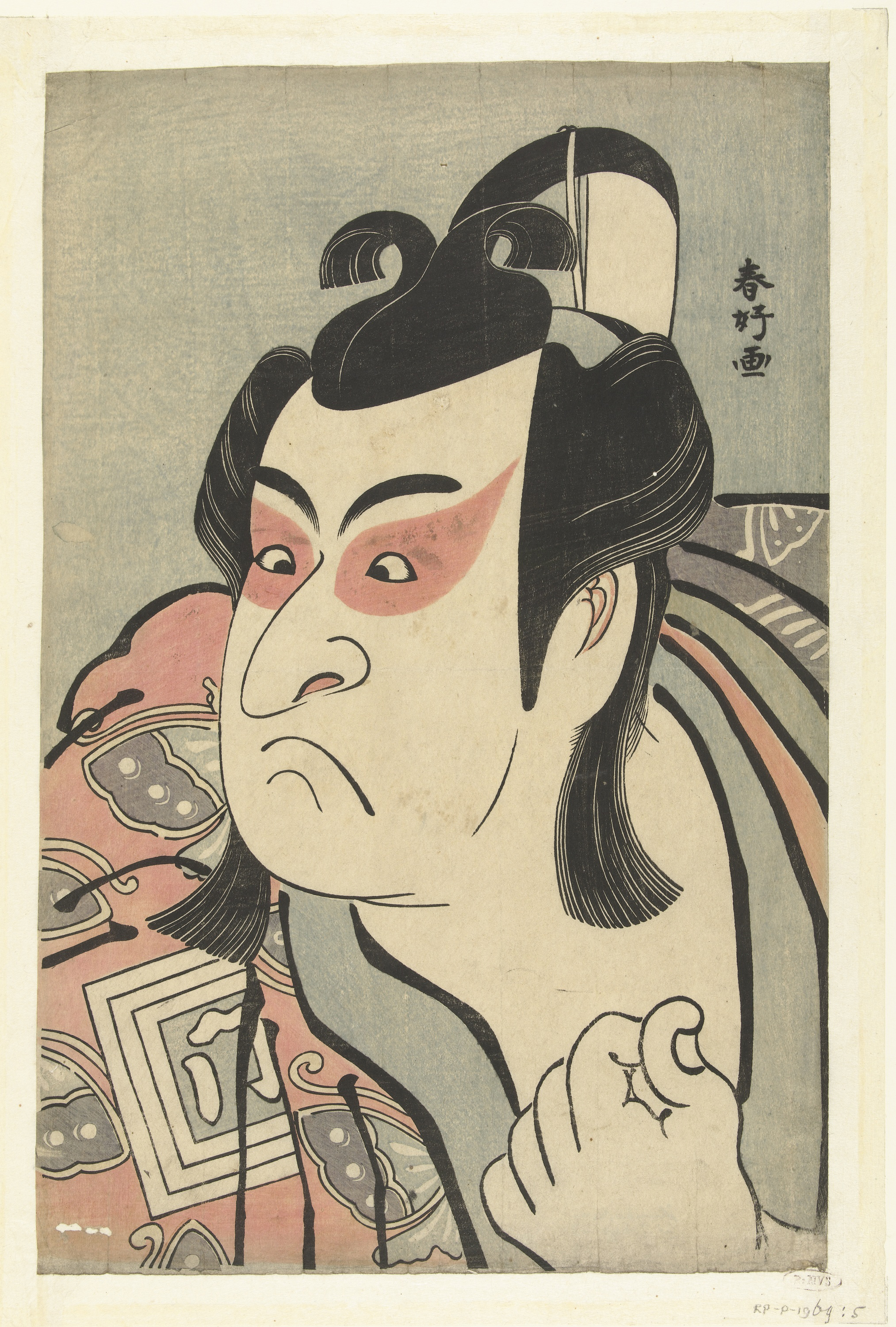
Ichikawa Monnosuke II

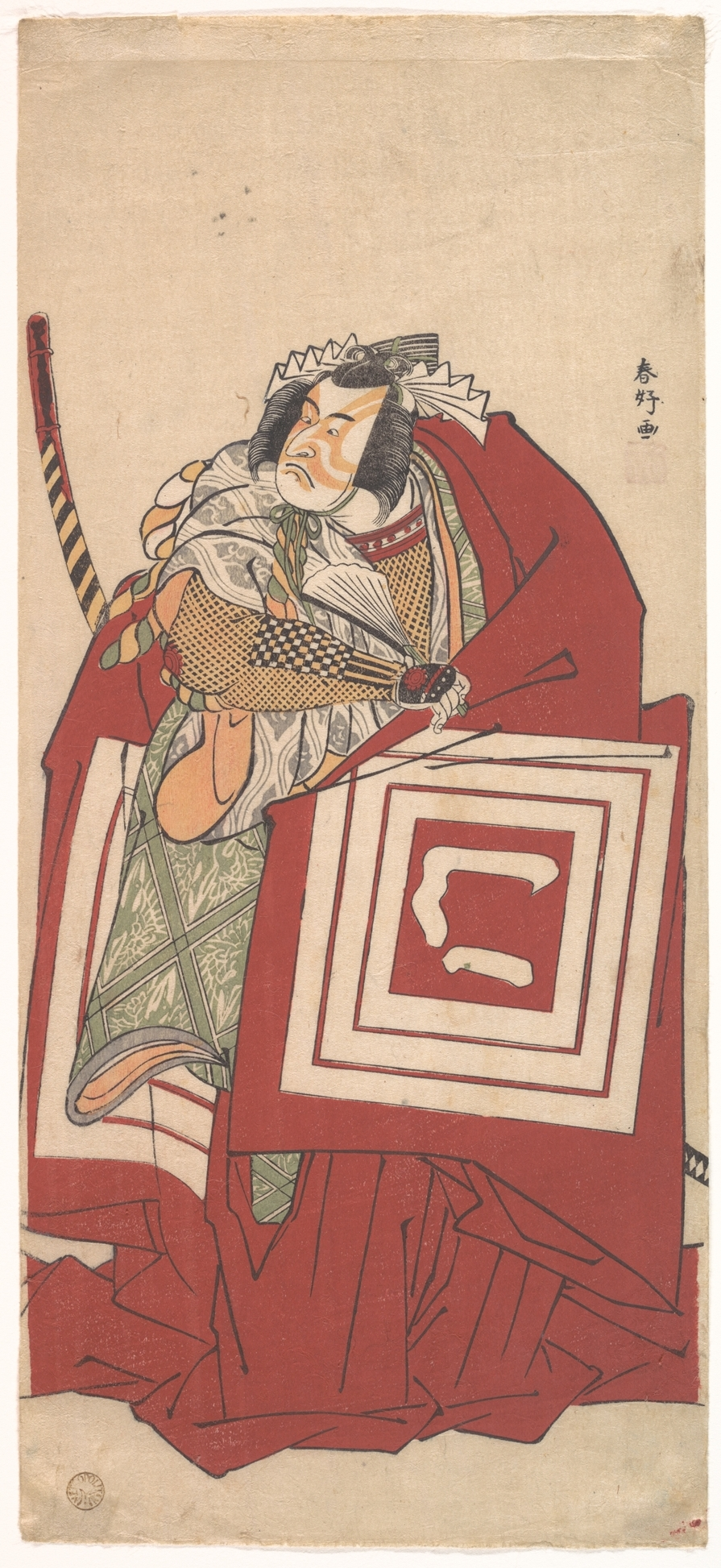
Ichikawa Monnosuke II in Shibaraku

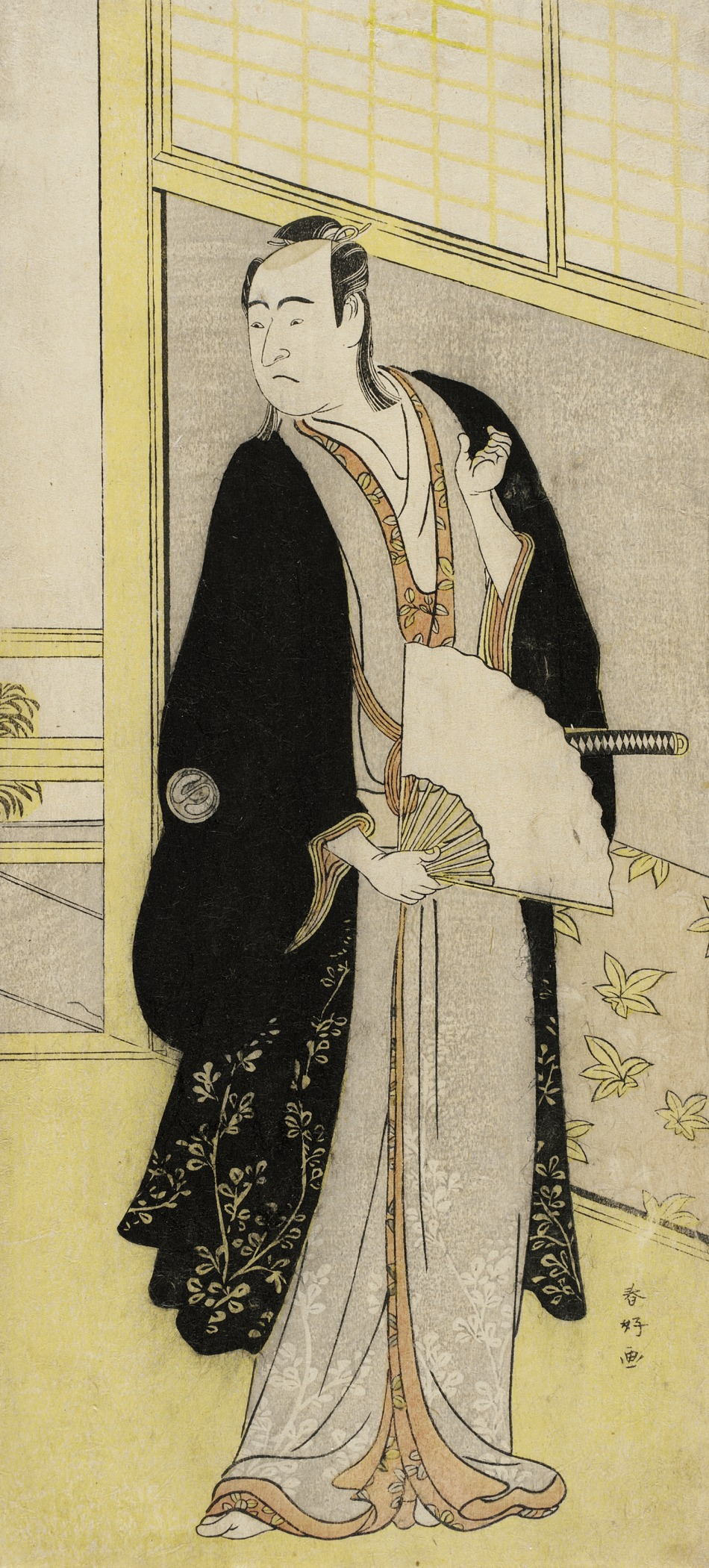
Sawamura Sojuro III

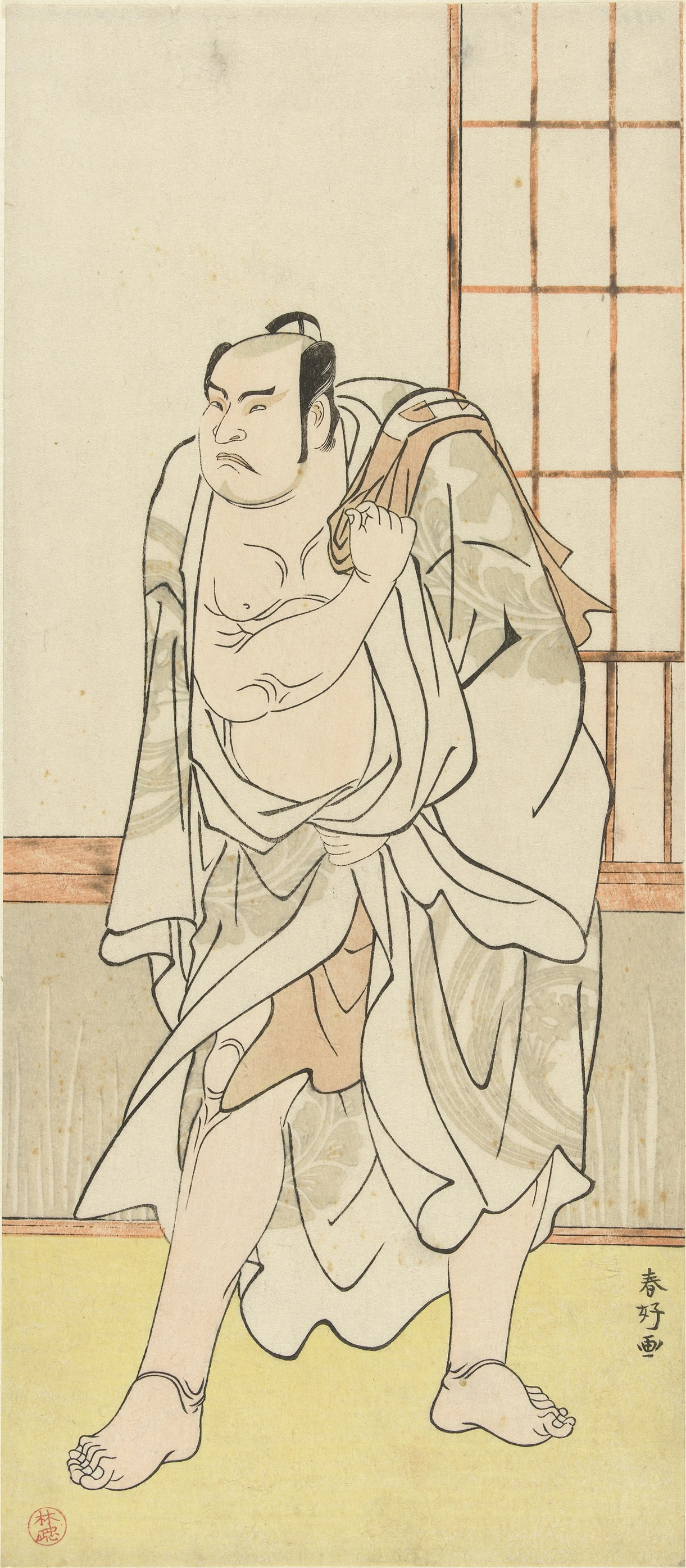
Otani Hiroji III

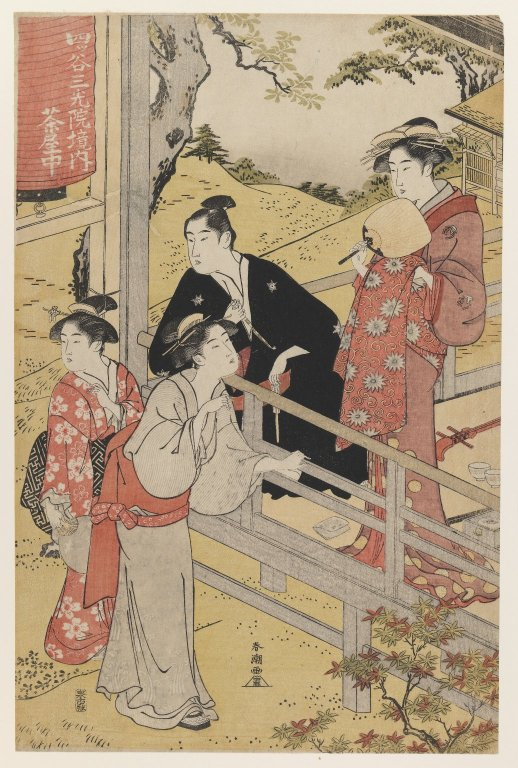
Teahouse at Sankoin Temple Yotsuya

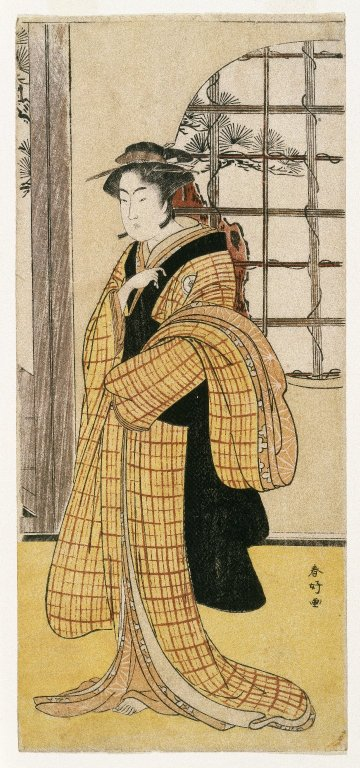
Iwai Hanshiro IV as Ohatsu

== Other ukiyo-e artists called "Shunkō" ==
Several other artists are known in English as "Shunkō", although their names are not all written with the same kanji. These other Shunkōs are:

- Katsukawa Shunkō II (春好, active 1805–21), better known as Katsukawa Shunsen
- Shunkō III (春江, active 1824–37), better known as Shunbaisai Hokuei
- Shunkō IV (春好, active 1802–32), better known as Shunkōsai Hokushū

== See also ==
Media related to Katsukawa Shunkō I at Wikimedia Commons
