= Kaigetsudō Anchi =

Japanese artist

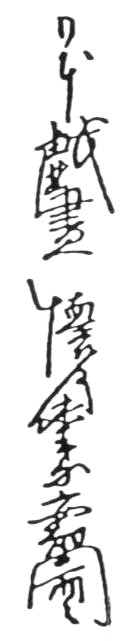
Signature of Kaigetsudō Anchi

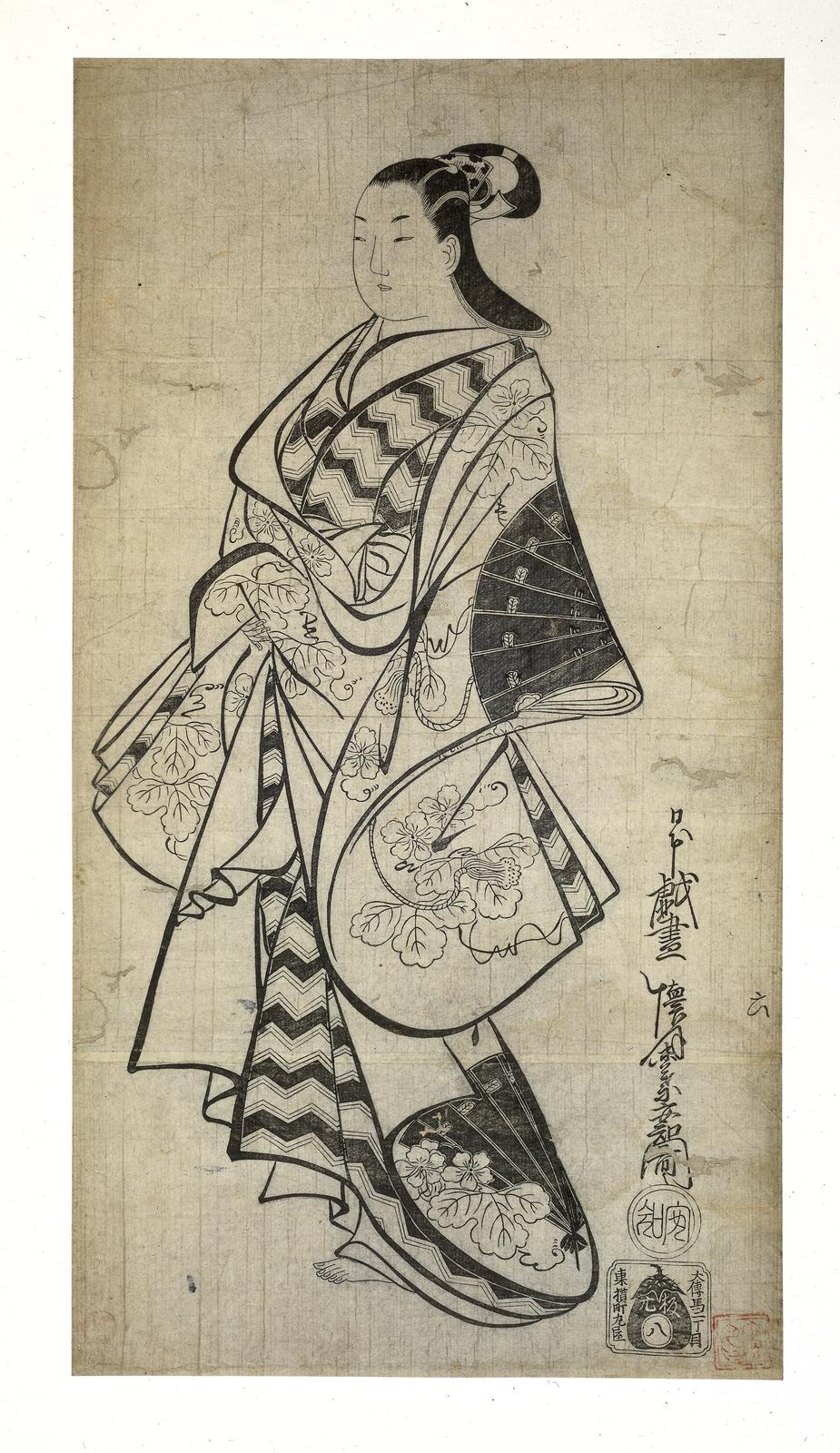
Courtesan of Edo, in outer garment decorated with ivy leaves, cherry blossom, fans and tasselled braids. Signed, sealed, marked and inscribed, c. 1711-1714

Kaigetsudō Anchi (壊月堂 安知, active c. 1700–1716) was a Japanese artist of the Kaigetsudō school of ukiyo-e art. He was the student and likely the son of the school's founder, Kaigetsudō Ando.

Also known by the Japanese reading Yasutomo of the same characters used for his name, Anchi is credited with around twenty surviving paintings and fewer than ten woodblock prints, almost all depicting courtesans in kimono decorated with a calligraphic pattern known as hogo-zome. He was the only one of Ando's pupils to found his own studio, called Chōyōdō, and the only one to incorporate the first character of his master's name ("An") into his own.

As is the case with most of the Kaigetsudō artists, the details of Anchi's life are almost completely unknown. His works, like those of other members of the school, are almost exclusively paintings, and of those almost all are of courtesans in exquisite kimono. His few woodblock prints are of the same subjects and style, and were likely a special commission. Though his works follow very much the distinctive style of Ando (and thus of the school as whole), Richard Lane points out that the attitude and emotion of the women in Anchi's works differs from those of his teacher. He writes, "whereas Ando's women can often pass for maidens of ladies of quality, Anchi's girls are manifestly courtesans, lovely but at the same time somehow predatory. They seem to be thinking only of themselves; most men would think twice before putting their love into such hands."
