= Baiōken Eishun =

Japanese painter and print artist

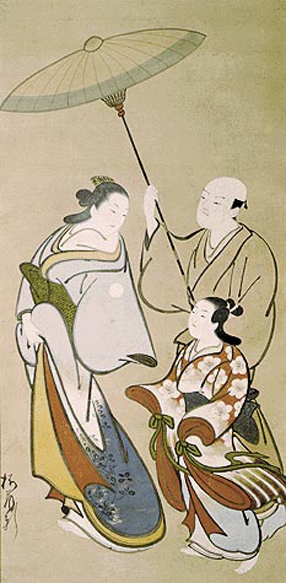
Courtesan in a Procession (遊女道中図), c. 1720-1730

Baiōken Eishun (Japanese: 梅翁軒永春; active c. 1710–1755) was a Japanese painter and print artist of the Kaigetsudō school of ukiyo-e art. He is also alternatively known as Hasegawa Eishun 長谷川永春, Baiōken Nagaharu, Takeda Harunobu and a number of other art-names. He produced both hanging scroll full-color paintings typical of the Kaigetsudō style and mode, and a number of designs for illustrations for woodblock printed books.

Richard Lane describes Eishun's work as very similar to that of Matsuno Chikanobu, though the courtesans in his bijinga (paintings of beauties) are somewhat taller, slimmer, and more serious-looking. Eishun, along with Chikanobu, represents something of a revival of the Kaigetsudō school which fell into decline in the preceding decades following the exile of its founder, Kaigetsudō Ando, in 1714.

Eishun and Chikanobu are also presumed to have worked for a time in association with the painter Baiyūken Katsunobu. According to some 1980s scholarship that redated one of Eishun's triptychs, however, both artists may instead have been independent rivals of the Kaigetsudō atelier rather than its late followers.
