= Ryūkōsai Jokei =

Japanese painter

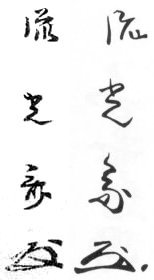
Examples of the signatures of Ryūkōsai Jokei

Ryūkōsai Jokei (Japanese: 流光斎 如圭) was a painter, illustrator, and designer of ukiyo-e-style Japanese woodblock prints in Osaka, who was active from about 1777 to 1809. He was a student of Shitomi Kangetsu (1747–1797), who in turn was the son and pupil of Tsukioka Settei (1710–1786). Ryūkōsai is considered to be either the founder or one of the founders of the Osaka school of ukiyo-e. He is best known for his portraits of actors. His prints are mostly in the hosoban format.

Toward the end of the 1770s, Ryūkōsai abandoned the academic style he had learned from Kangetsu, turning instead to actor portraiture in the ukiyo-e style, and surprised the Osaka print world with his incisive approach to the genre. In 1787-88 Matsumoto Hōji, identified as one of the most enthusiastic Osaka kabuki fans and connoisseurs of the day, praised his portraits for having captured the true essence of the actors; Ryūkōsai's aim was to depict the actor as the person behind the mask, expressing the emotion appropriate to the role and scene, achieving an innovative degree of verisimilitude in the Kamigata region.

Although his active career lasted around thirty years, very few of Ryūkōsai's single-sheet prints survive: his earliest is dated November 1791 and his last to around 1800, with only sixteen signed designs and around thirty further unsigned but attributed works known today, many surviving in a single impression. All but two are in the hosoban format, and most, if not all, were produced as multi-sheet polyptychs, of which Ryūkōsai often signed only one sheet, complicating later attribution of unsigned examples in his style. He also painted small actor portraits that were compiled into albums, which likewise survive only rarely; the Osaka Museum of History holds one such album, containing thirty-six actor portraits.

Pupils of Ryūkōsai include Shōkōsai Hanbei and Urakusai Nagahide.

== Gallery ==
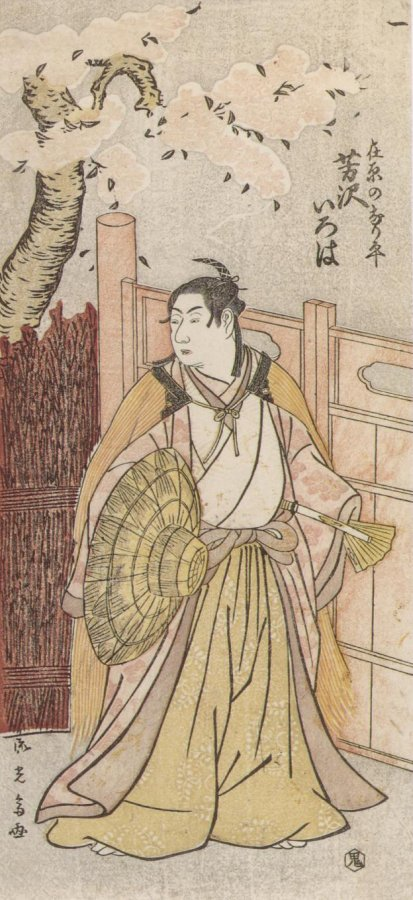
Woodblock print by Ryūkōsai Jokei of kabuki actor Yoshizawa Iroha in the role of Ariwara no Narihira
