= Yukio Furuyama =

Japanese weightlifter (born 1938)

Personal information
- Nationality: Japanese
- Born: 26 July 1938 (age 86); Fukushima, Japan

Sport
- Sport: Weightlifting

Yukio Furuyama (古山 征男, Furuyama Yukio, born 26 July 1938) is a Japanese weightlifter. He competed at the 1956 Summer Olympics, the 1960 Summer Olympics and the 1964 Summer Olympics.
