= Furuyama Moromasa =

18th-century Japanese ukiyo-e artist

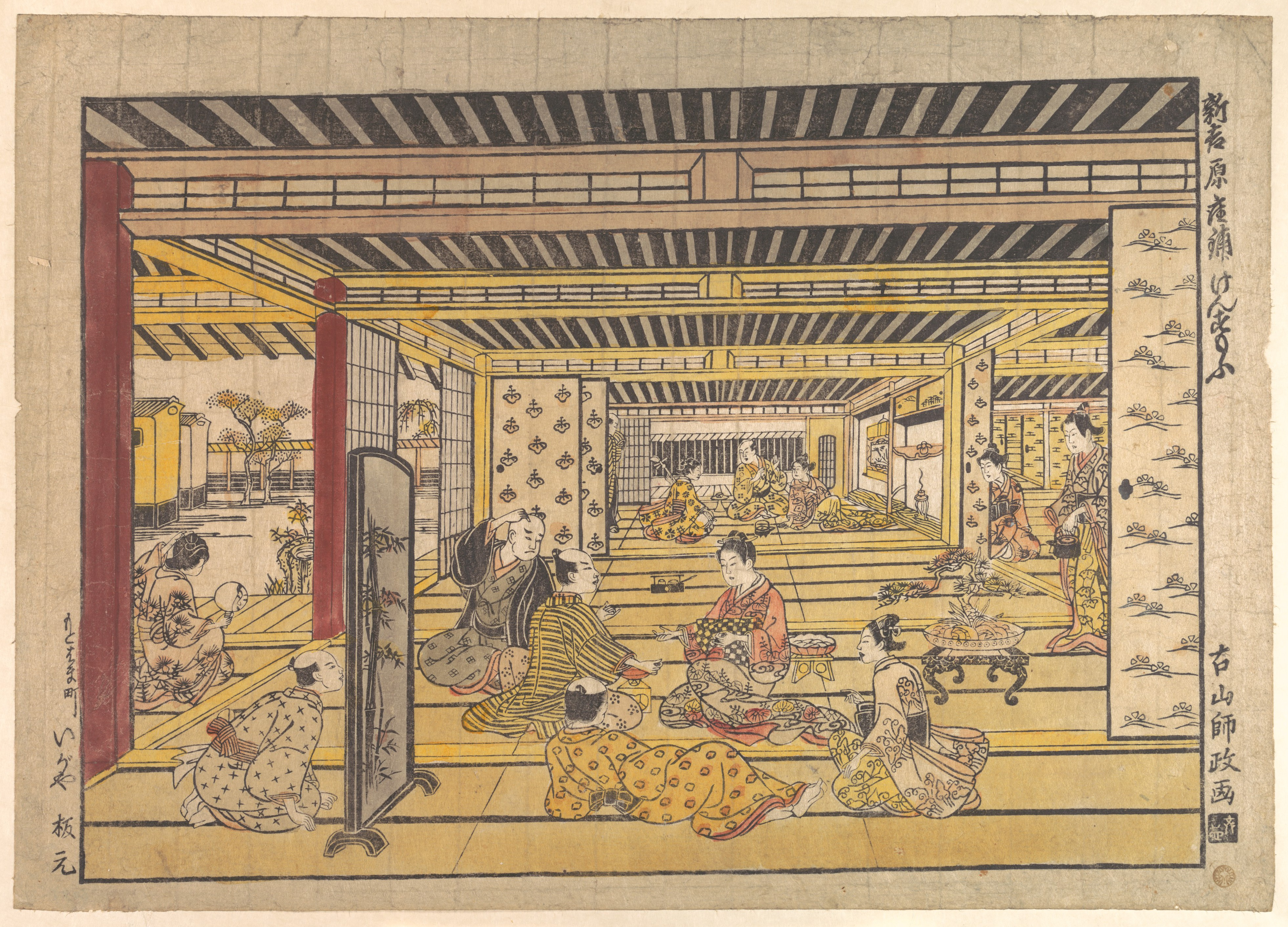
A Game of "Hand Sumo" in Yoshiwara

Furuyama Moromasa (Japanese: 古山師政, act. ca. 1695-1748) was a Japanese ukiyo-e painter and print artist active during the 18th century.

== Life and works ==
Few details of his life have survived. He was born in Edo (Tokyo), the son of the artist Furuyama Moroshige, who in turn was the son of the master artist Hishikawa Moronobu but established his lineage, the Furuyama School.

Moromasa designed woodblock prints with genre scenes of ordinary life, sporting contests, activities in the Yoshiwara district, and similar subjects. He was one of the first Japanese artists to use linear perspective, a technique first used to show interiors, such as tea houses, in a genre known as uki-e. This was likely done under the influence of megane-e (vedute) from Europe and China. He also produced paintings in the popular category of 'beautiful women' (bijin-ga).

Moromasa's most famous work is a pair of handscroll paintings depicting the theater district (Azuma yarō; owned by Central Library, Edinburgh) and brothel district (Shinobu-yama; owned by Museo Stibbert, Florence) of Edo, measuring 13 meters and 16 meters long respectively.

He was active until around the mid-1700s and wrote several texts on the engraving. The Furuyama school's tradition continued under the pupils Furuyama Morotane, active from 1711 to 1736, and Furuyama Morotsugu, active during the Genroku (1688–1704) and Hōei (1704–1711) eras.

== See also ==
- Schools of ukiyo-e artists
