= Nobutada =

- Gender: Male

Origin
- Origin: Japanese
- Meaning: Different meanings depending on the kanji used

Nobutada (written: 信忠, 信君 or 信尹) is a masculine Japanese given name. Notable people with the name include:

- Anayama Nobutada (穴山 信君; 1541–1582), Japanese samurai
- Fuji Nobutada (富士 信忠; died 1583), Japanese samurai
- Konoe Nobutada (近衛 信尹; 1565–1614), Japanese poet, calligrapher, painter and diarist
- Nobutada Saji (佐治 信忠; born 1945), Japanese businessman
- Oda Nobutada (織田 信忠; 1557–1582), Japanese samurai
