= Gertrude Ann Youse =

American artist

- Died: 1994; Massachusetts

Gertrude Ann Youse, more commonly known as Gay Youse, was a painter, teacher, and gallery director. She spent most of her life making art prevalent and important to the Duxbury, Massachusetts community. Moving from Boston in the 1950s, where she had attended school at the Museum of Fine Arts, Youse was influenced by Austrian expressionist Oskar Kokoschka who gave a talk at her school and was exhibited in the Boston museum. Youse painted portraits and still lifes but was mainly known for landscapes.

From 1958 to 1968 Youse taught classes at the Duxbury Art Association to all ages. She continued to teach out of her studio on Church Street but Gay's attention was drawn to the Helen Bumpus Gallery in 1968 where she became the gallery director for 20 years. She exhibited artists like Alice Neel, Harold Tovish, Mariana Pineda, Louis Tarlow, Jack Wolfe, Penelope Lencks, David Aronson, and Karl Zerbe. To stimulate students in the local high school, Duxbury High School, Youse showed the students works in the gallery. Many of her students went on to becoming artists in their own right or art educators. The high school created a perpetual scholarship in her name for Duxbury graduates.

From 1970s to her death in 1994, Youse spent her time in Maine teaching and painting her surroundings.
