= Kaigetsudō school =

18th-century Japanese school of painting and printmaking

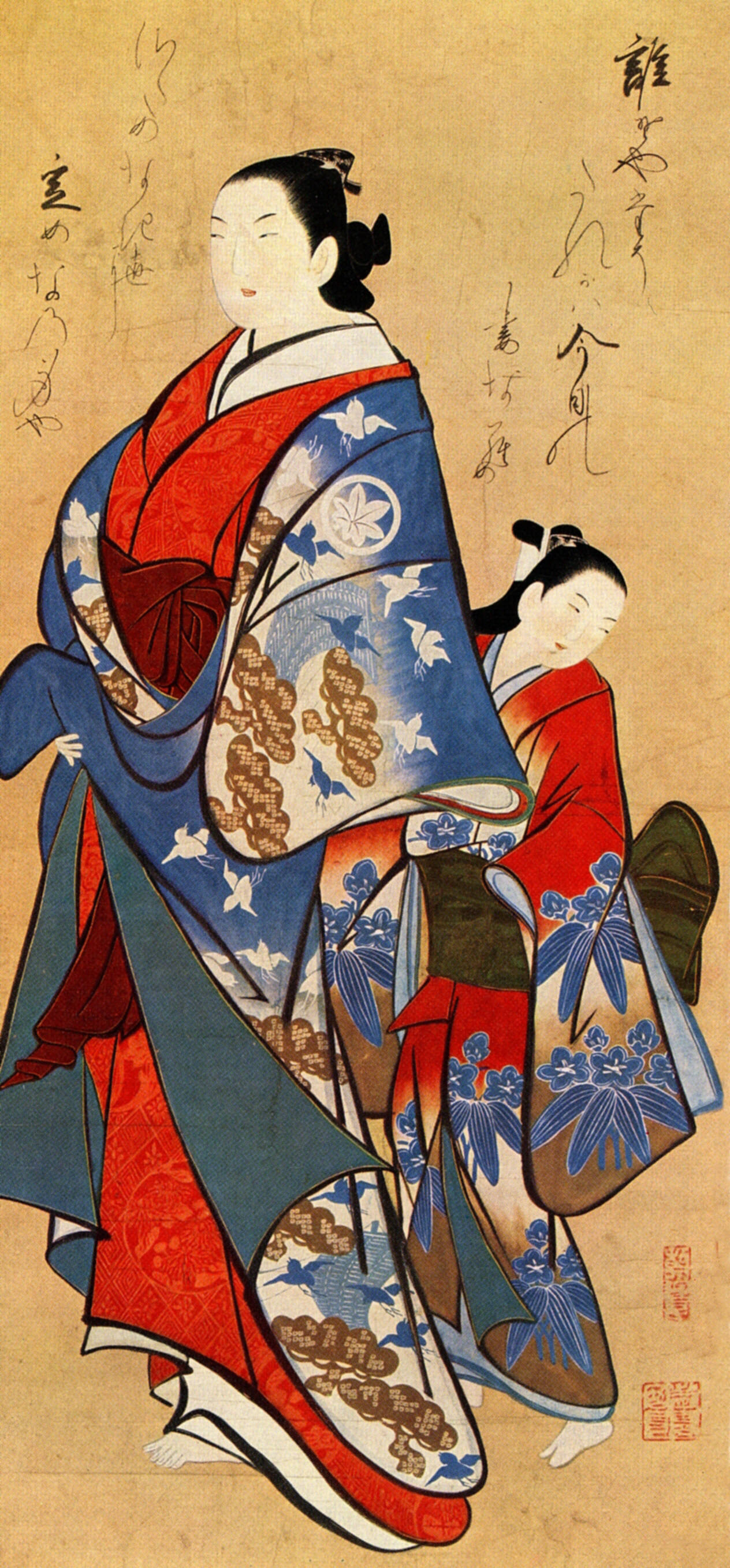
Courtesan walking with an attendant. Color on silk, Kaigetsudō Ando.

The Kaigetsudō school (懐月堂派, -ha) was a school of ukiyo-e painting and printmaking founded in Edo around 1700–1714. It is often said that the various Kaigetsudō artists' styles are so similar, many scholars find it nearly impossible to differentiate them; thus, many Kaigetsudō paintings are attributed to the school's founder, Kaigetsudō Ando, which may have been in fact painted by his disciples.

The school's founder, Ando Yasunori, known by his art-name (gō) Kaigetsudō Ando, was a specialist in bijinga, images of beautiful women. Unlike his disciples, Ando produced only paintings, never prints. His style, and that of the school, draws strongly upon the style of the Torii school, which is known primarily for its theater signboards. The style of both schools is distinguished by its use of thick lines and bright colors. However, the Kaigetsudō style is said to depict subjects in a very stereotyped manner, which is in sharp contrast to the style of the Torii school.

The Kaigetsudō artists are known primarily for their prints of bijin with very colorful and complex patterns on their kimonos. While these images may be seen as displaying fashion designs, it is far more likely that the artists intended to focus on the beauty and grace of the women themselves. The printmakers sought to share the fame and magnificence of the women of the Yoshiwara with those unable to afford to experience the ukiyo (Floating World) in person.

Most surviving Kaigetsudō paintings were executed with inexpensive pigments on paper rather than on silk, unlike many other costly ukiyo-e commissions made for wealthy patrons; this has led some scholars to suggest that they were sold as souvenirs of visits to the Yoshiwara pleasure quarter, located just north of Asakusa where Kaigetsudō Ando lived. This hypothesis finds some support in the signatures used by Kaigetsudō Ando and his five direct disciples, who typically preceded their names with the characters for Nihon giga (日本戯画, "Japanese painting for amusement").

While the school produced many unique works, many were based on reproducing very similar poses or images, with only the colors or kimono pattern changed.

Though a handful of artists took on the Kaigetsudō name for themselves, and sought to imitate the style, the work of Kaigetsudō Ando's direct disciples fell into sharp decline after his banishment to Ōshima in 1714.

== Significant artists of the Kaigetsudō school ==
- Kaigetsudō Ando – founder of the school
- Kaigetsudō Anchi
- Kaigetsudō Dohan
- Kaigetsudō Doshin
- Kaigetsudō Doshu
- Kaigetsudō Doshū
- Matsuno Chikanobu
- Tōsendō Rifū
- Takizawa Shigenobu
- Baiyūken Katsunobu
- Baiōken Eishun (a.k.a. Baiōken Nagaharu, Takeda Harunobu)
