= Gigadō Ashiyuki =

Japanese artist and painter

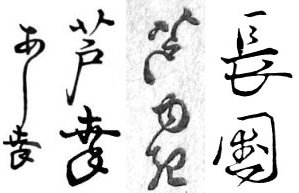
Examples of the signature of Ashiyuki, the one on the right reading “Nagakuni”

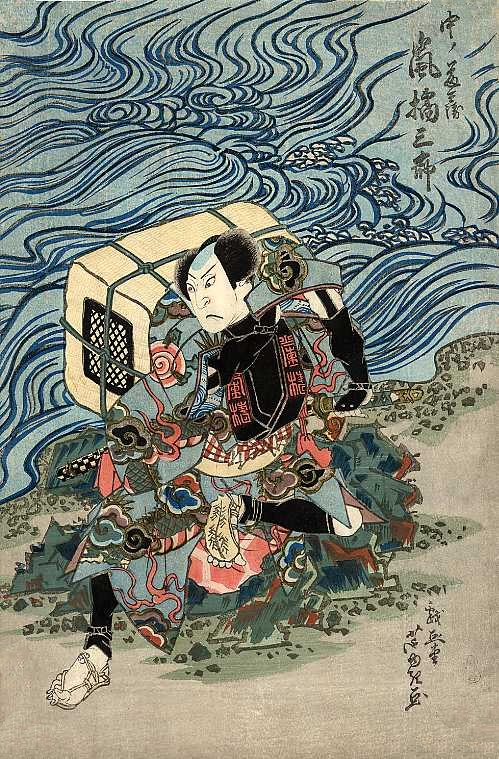
Woodblock print by Gigadō Ashiyuki of kabuki actor Arashi Rikan II in character

Gigadō Ashiyuki (戯画堂 芦幸) was a designer of ukiyo-e style Japanese woodblock prints in Osaka, who was active from about 1813 to 1833. He was a pupil of Asayama Ashikuni, and was also a haiku poet. Ashiyuki is best known for his ōban sized (about 14 by 10 inches or 36 by 25 centimeters), prints of kabuki actors, although he also illustrated books, and designed surimono.

Among the many artists active in Osaka's regional yakusha-e tradition between the late 18th century and 1860, Ashiyuki is considered the only one truly comparable to his counterparts in other regions. The distinct Osaka and Edo styles of yakusha-e derived in part from their different acting traditions: Ichikawa Danjūrō I (1660–1704) developed the aragoto style typical of Edo acting, with extraordinary characters of prodigious strength and courage suited to the temperament of the shogunate's military capital, while Sakata Tōjūrō I (1647–1709), performing in the merchant city of Osaka, developed a style combining gentle, nuanced sensuality with a refined and rather effeminate persona.

== Nagakuni ==
Gigadō Ashiyuki used the name "Nagakuni" (長国) from about 1814 to 1821. There is another Osaka printmaker who in known as either Shūei Nagakuni or as Naniwa Nagakuni. This latter artist was a student of Nagahide and was active from about 1814 to the 1820s.

== Pupils ==
Ashiyuki was a significant figure in Kamigata printmaking, in no small part because of his influence as a teacher. His pupils included Ashifune (d. 1818), Ashiharu (active 1823–1824), Ashihiro (active 1816–1824), Ashikiyo (active 1814–1816), Ashimaro, Ashimaru (later known as Jukōdō Yoshikuni), Ashinuki (active 1816–1818), Ashisato (active 1800–1816), Ashitaka (active around 1817), and Ashitomo (active 1814–1817).

== Collections ==
His work is held in the permanent collections of many museums worldwide, including the Metropolitan Museum of Art, the Indianapolis Museum of Art, the Walters Art Museum, the Van Gogh Museum, the Fine Arts Museums of San Francisco, the Finnish National Gallery, the Birmingham Museums, the British Museum, the Philadelphia Museum of Art, the University of Michigan Museum of Art, the Museum of Fine Arts, Boston, and the Tokyo Fuji Art Museum.
