= Matsuno Chikanobu =

Japanese painter

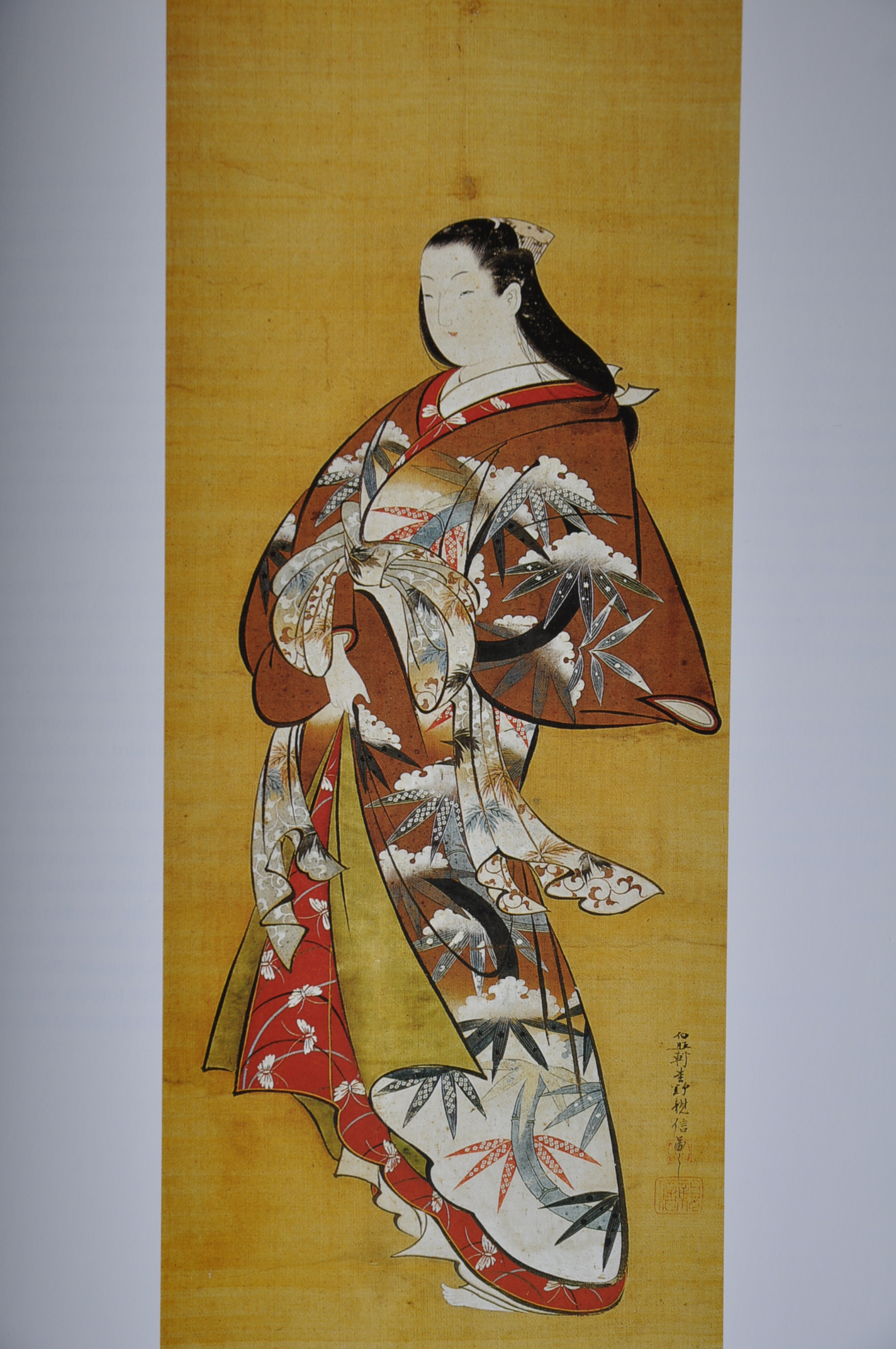
Matsuno Chikanobu, ink and colours on silk, kakemono 37" by 14", painted between 1704 and 1716 : Parading Courtesan.

Matsuno Chikanobu (松野親信, fl. 1720s) was a Japanese painter of the Kaigetsudō school of ukiyo-e art. Believed to be one of the most popular painters of his time, his work, very much in the Kaigetsudō style, consists largely of bijin-ga (pictures of beautiful ladies) and features bright colors and exquisite kimono fashions.

He is believed to have worked closely with Baiōken Eishun, another Kaigetsudō artist whose style shows significant similarities.
