= Kikukawa Eizan =

Japanese ukiyo-e print designer

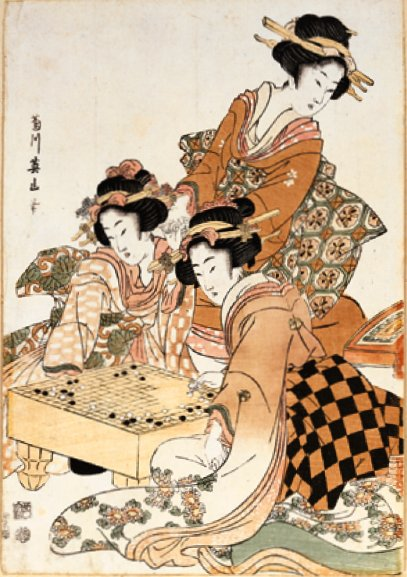
Geisha playing go, a woodblock print

Kikukawa Eizan (菊川 英山; 1787 – July 17, 1867) was a designer of ukiyo-e style Japanese woodblock prints. He first studied with his father, Eiji, a minor painter of the Kanō school, and subsequently with Suzuki Nanrei (1775–1844), of the Shijō school. He is believed to have also studied with ukiyo-e artist Totoya Hokkei (1790–1850). Eizan produced numerous woodblock prints of beautiful women (bijin-ga) in the 1830s, but then abandoned printmaking in favor of painting.

This artist should not be confused with Harukawa Eizan, an ukiyo-e print designer who was active in the 1790s.

Eizan was the most prolific, longest-lived and ultimately the best of those late followers of Utamaro who attempted to carry on the master's bijin style after his death in 1806.

Along with Tsukimaro and Utamaro II, Eizan has generally been dismissed by connoisseurs as a plagiarist of Utamaro's late style, but his work in fact develops, like that of most ukiyo-e artists, from a close identification with a leading master to a studied independence, and contains pieces of remarkable beauty and interest.

As Eizan reached artistic maturity he began to develop his own figural style, still focused for the most part on prints of beautiful women (bijin-ga). Eizan's work retains the sensitivities and lyricism that marks the Utamaro style, as opposed to the earthier realism and more overt sensuality of Kunisada and Keisai Eisen.

Eizan's depictions of young women underwent a clear stylistic evolution over his career. In his early works, faces were based on a pronounced oval with a tapered chin, a long straight nose and arched eyebrows. Around 1808 - 1813, faces became fuller and slightly less elliptical, with the nose sometimes inclined toward the aquiline and the lower lip occasionally larger than the upper. During what many consider his finest period, from 1814 to 1817, the faces of his bijin became thinner, marked by an indefinable delicacy and calm that some have nicknamed a "doll's face"; this style is also notable for its reversal of the general trend toward greater volume, as the physiognomy narrowed slightly rather than widening, at least for a few brief years. By around 1818, however, Eizan had substantially increased this volume once again, depicting women with thicker necks and heavier faces and bodies. Toward the end of his printmaking career, Eizan's bijinga reflected the popular fashions of the day: female forms took on greater volume, faces became wider and more rectilinear, postures were often slightly curved or bent forward, and clothing was frequently rendered with heavy modelling.

Eizan, like Toyokuni I in actor prints, is the last manifestation of the classical ukiyo-e style in bijin work, with harmonious colors and graceful lines and subjects. After him, one senses the introduction of a different aesthetic, with harsher colors, angular lines and less ethereal material, more of an emphasis, in sum, on the material weight of earthly life, rather than its transformation into something of elegance.

Eizan was left-handed, which was strange at such a time in Japan.

== Gallery ==
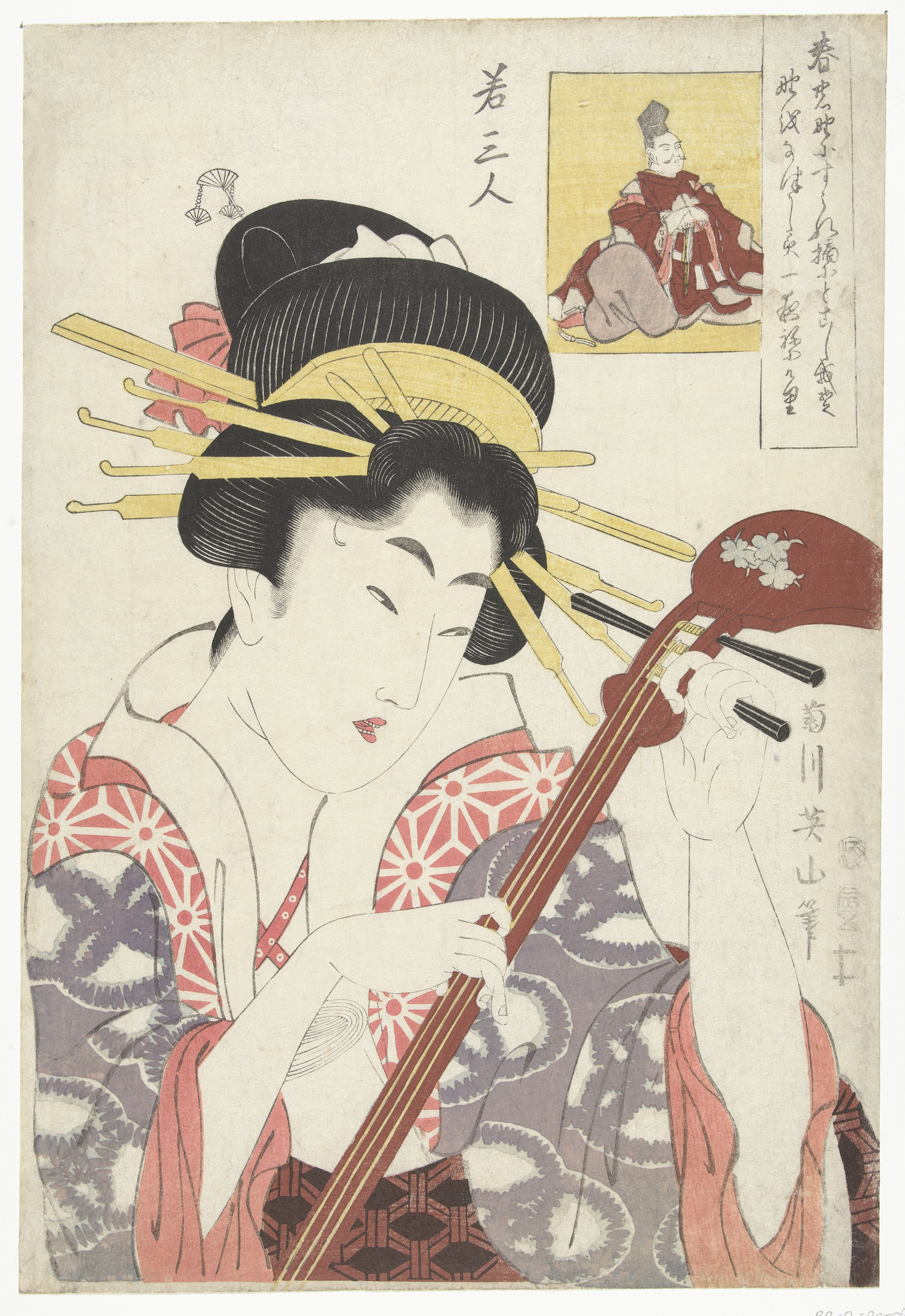
Woman with Shamisen. 1808

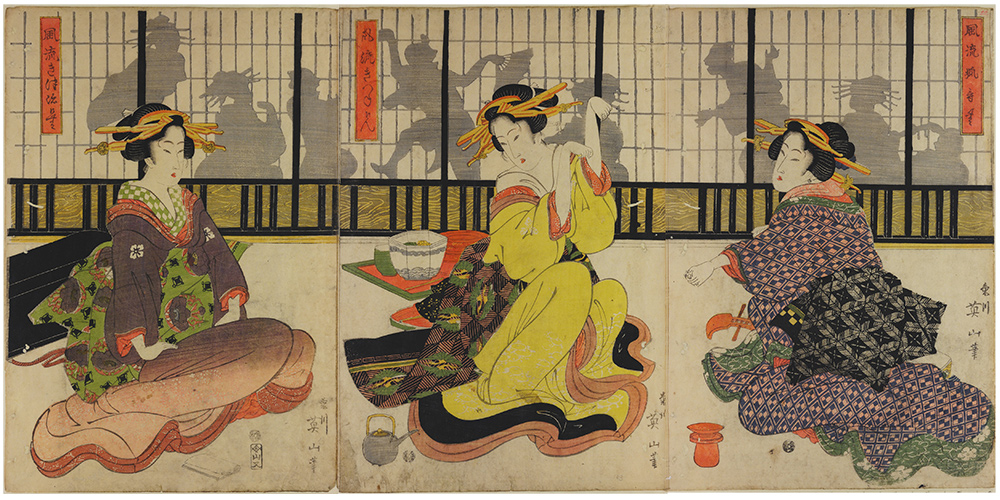
Geisha Playing the Hand-Game Kitsune-ken, 1820

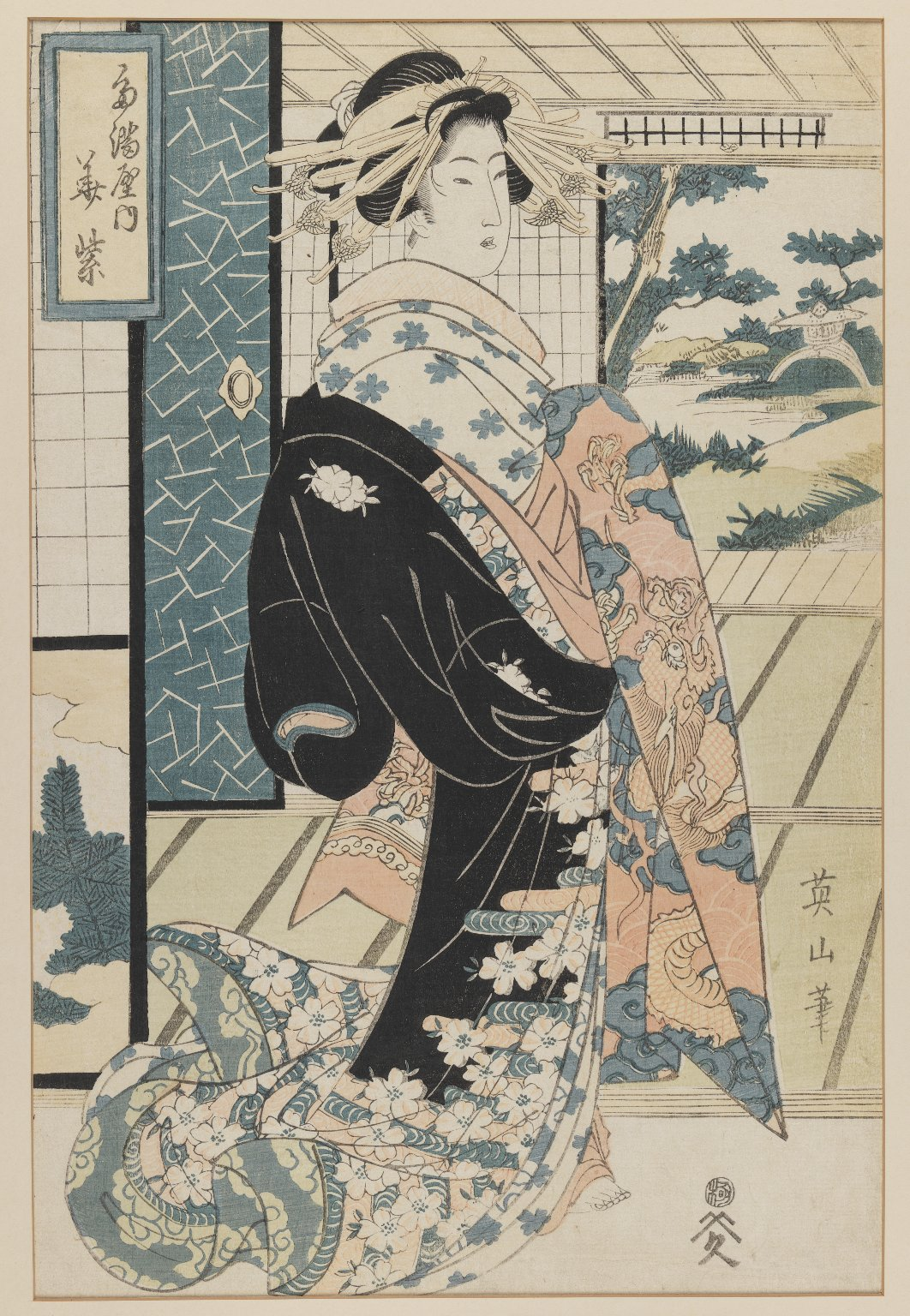
Bijin

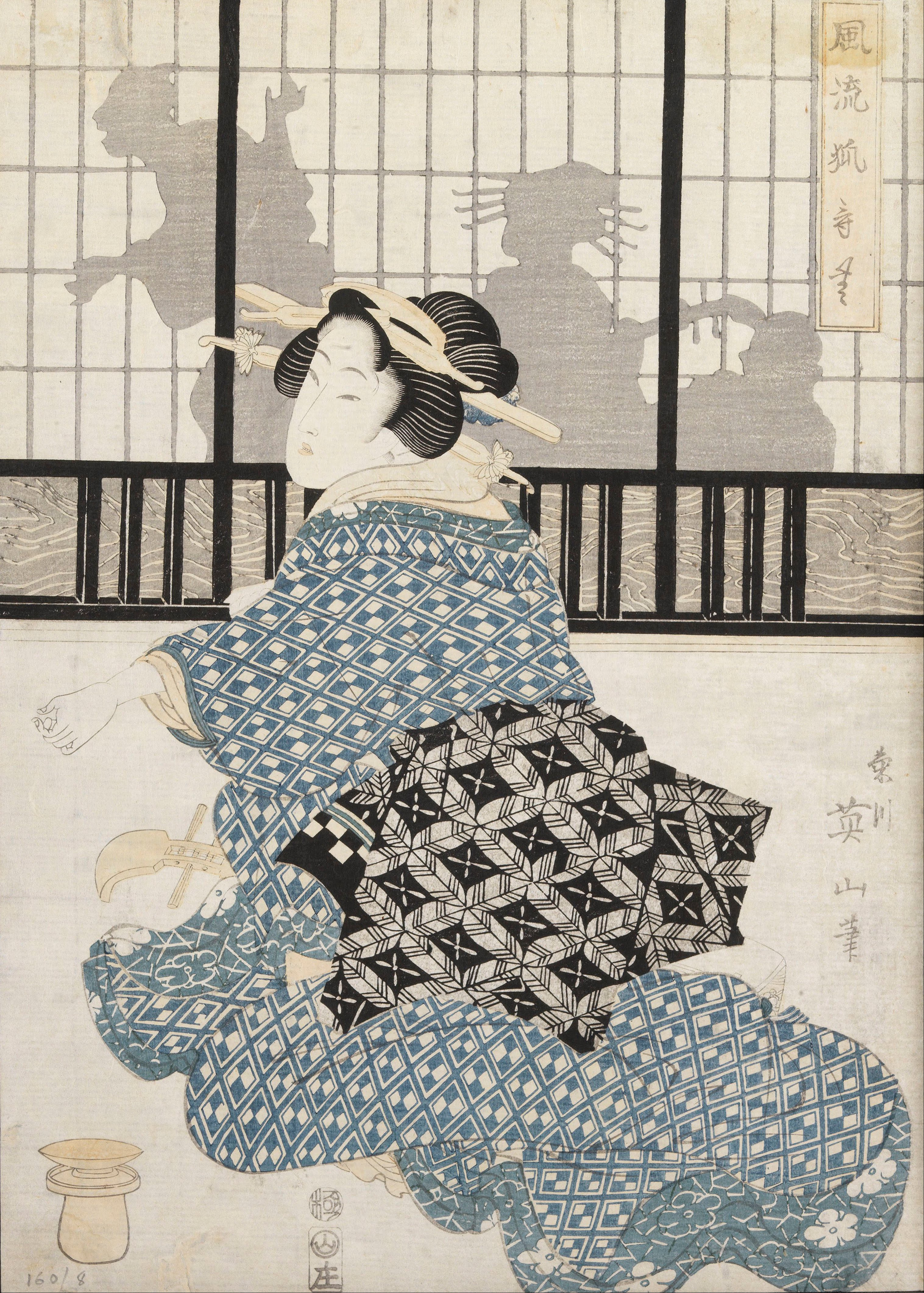

Woman Performing the Tea Ceremony

== Bibliography ==
- Lane, Richard. (1978). Images from the Floating World, The Japanese Print. Oxford: Oxford University Press. ISBN 9780192114471; OCLC 5246796.
- Newland, Amy Reigle. (2005). Hotei Encyclopedia of Japanese Woodblock Prints. Amsterdam: Hotei. ISBN 9789074822657; OCLC 61666175
