= Yanagawa Shigenobu =

Japanese ukiyo-e artist

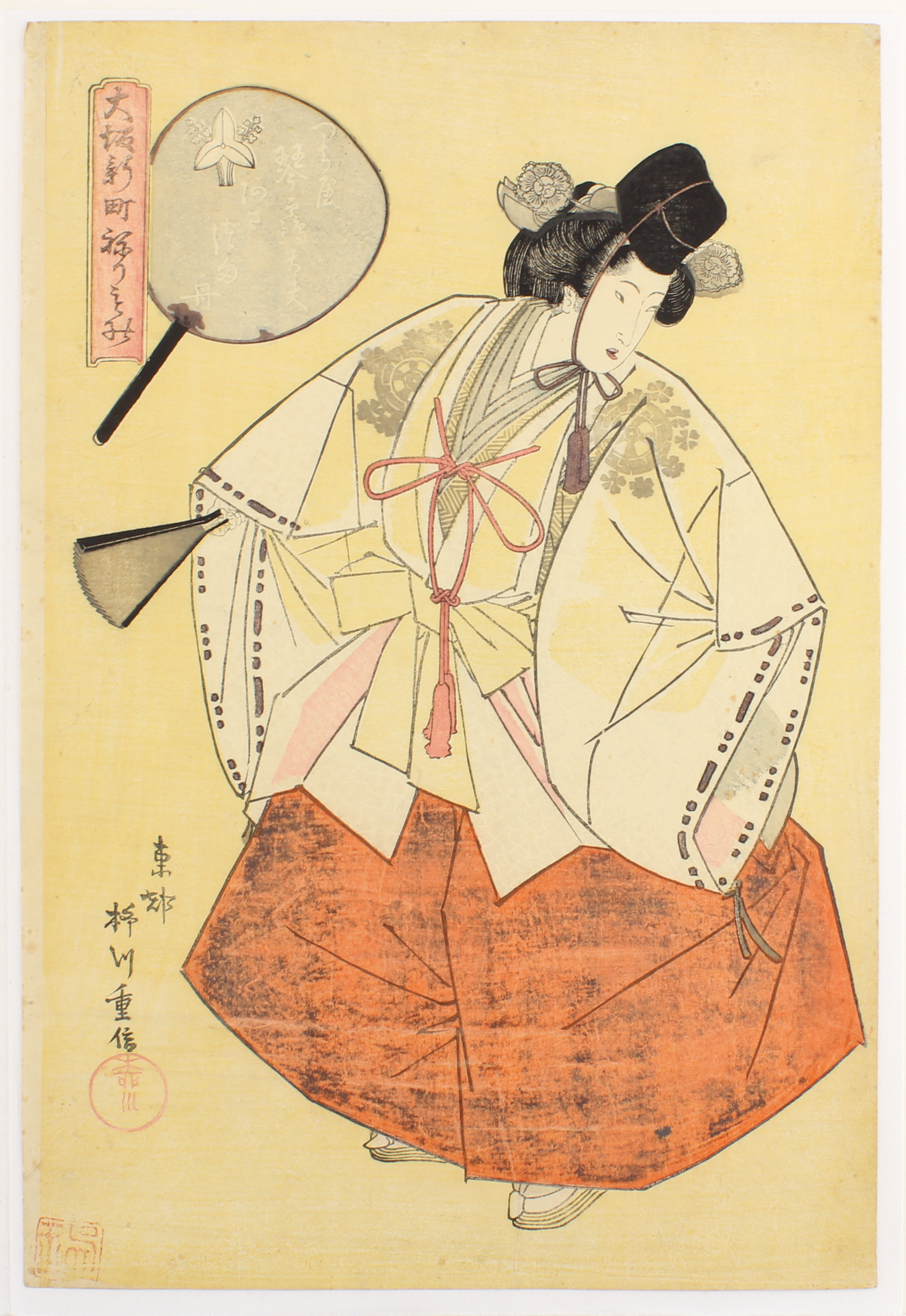
The Courtesan Kotozuru of the Tsuruya Brothel as an Asazuma Boat Prostitute from the series Costume Parade of the Shinmachi Quarter in Osaka (held at the Metropolitan Museum of Art)

Yanagawa Shigenobu (柳川 重信; 1787–1832) was a Japanese artist in the ukiyo-e style.

== Life ==
Shigenobu was born in Edo as Suzuki Jūbei in 1787; over his career he used the art names Kinsai, Raitō, Rinsai and Ushōsai. He was active in Edo from the Bunka period onward. His Osaka period dated from 1822 to 1825. In Edo, he resided in Honjo Yanagawa-chō district. He was first the pupil, then son-in-law, and finally adopted son of the Edo master painter Katsushika Hokusai. He designed illustrated books, prints, and surimono. In Osaka, he worked with the gifted block cutter and printer Tani Seikō.

== Art ==
Shigenobu focused on theatrical subjects, but some of his best work in Osaka includes a series of deluxe ōban prints depicting geisha in the Shinmachi Nerimono parade in Osaka, and approximately 30 fine surimono on various subjects (at least 18 in collaboration with the Tsuru-ren Crane Group of kyōka poets), with blocks cut and printed by Seikō.

== Influence ==
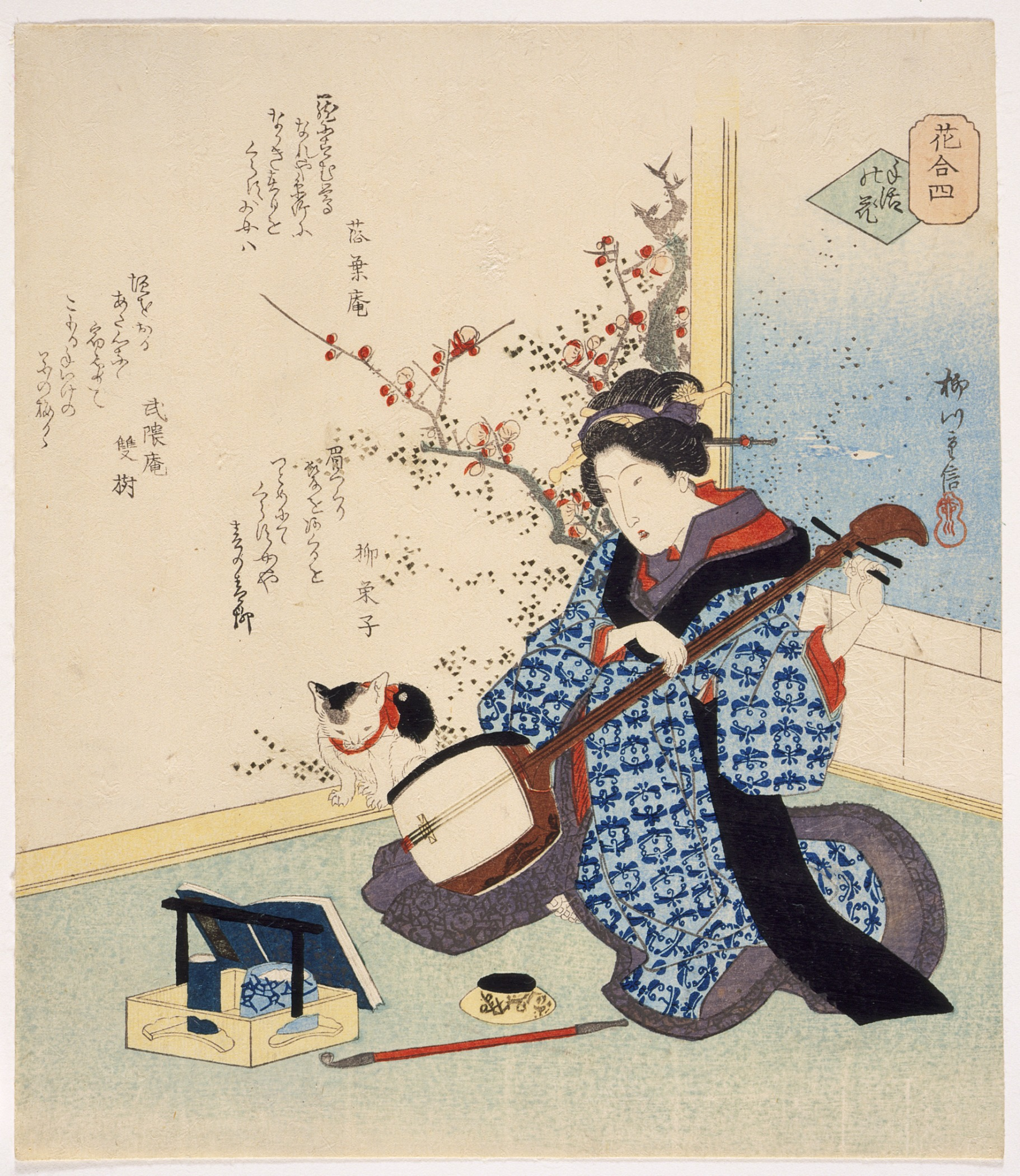
Geisha tuning a shamisen, circa 1835 (held at the Los Angeles County Museum of Art)

Shigenobu’s pupils included Utagawa Kuninao; Shigeharu; Yanagawa Nobusada (Yokinobu); Shigemasa; Shigemitsu.

== See also ==
- Erotic art
- Shunga
- Ukiyo-e
