= Urakusai Nagahide =

19th-century Japanese woodblock artist

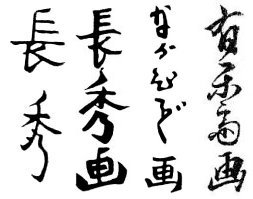
Signatures of Urakusai Nagahide reading from left to right: “Nagahide” (長秀), “Nagahide ga” (長秀 画), “Nagahide ga” (ちょひで 画), and “Chōshūsai ga” (長秀斎 画)

Urakusai Nagahide (Japanese: 有楽斎 長秀), was a designer of ukiyo-e style Japanese woodblock prints who was active from about 1804 to about 1848. He is also known as Yūrakusai Nagahide (有楽斎 長秀), Nakamura Nagahide (中邑 長秀 or 中村 長秀), Chōshū (長秀), and as Chōshūsai (長秀斎). “Nagahide” and “Chōshū” are written with the same kanji. The ending “sai” means studio or hall, and is added or omitted at will by many Japanese artists. According to some historians, the studio name "Urakusai" may refer to his having lived near the ruins of the manor of Oda Urakusai.

Nagahide worked in both Kyoto and Osaka. His early prints resemble those of his teacher Ryūkōsai Jokei, but were also influenced by Shōkōsai Hanbei. Over the course of three decades, Nagahide's rendering of actor likenesses moved from Ryūkōsai's influence toward a more personal approach, becoming particularly evident in his ōban nishiki-e, in which his style grew more curvilinear and flowing, in keeping with the broader trend in Kamigata printmaking from the late 1810s onward. Such a radical change occurred in Nagahide’s style that some scholars believe that the body of works signed “Nagahide” may actually have been created by two different artists. From the 1810s to the 1830s, Nagahide was the most prolific designer of stencil prints (kappazuri) depicting the annual costume parade in the Gion district of Kyoto, and he continued producing kappazuri long after full-color woodblock prints (nishiki-e) had become the standard for Japanese woodblock prints. This makes him a notable example of an artist who worked simultaneously in both media; he also experimented with a range of formats rarely seen elsewhere in Kamigata printmaking, including hosoban, the distinctive hexagonal kappazuri-e, and hashira-e. He is also known to have been the last of several artists, including Seikoku, Hotta, Harusada, Hidemaro, Kashō, Yukinaga, Harukawa Goshichi and Hasegawa Toyokuni, to contribute to a collaborative print series, in which he nonetheless designed around two-thirds of the total prints. His students include Nagashige, Hidekatsu, Hidekuni, Hidemari, and Naniwa Nagakuni.

== Gallery ==
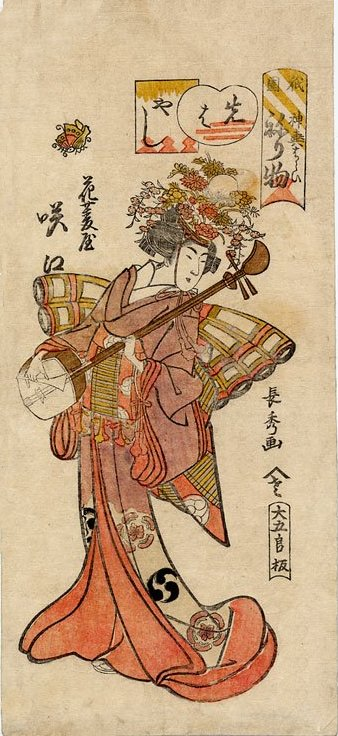
Stencil prints (kappazuri) titled Sakie of the Hanabishiya

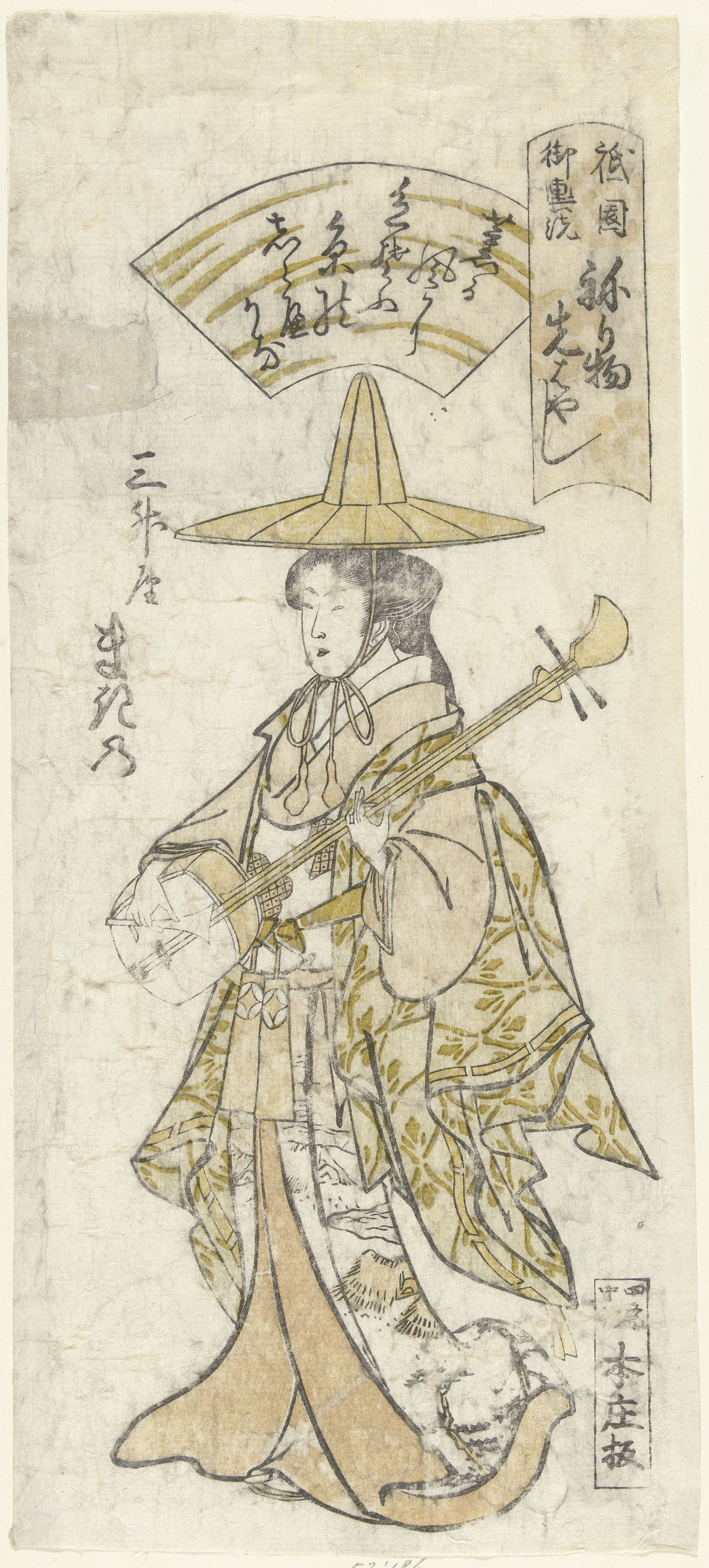
Courtesan Makino

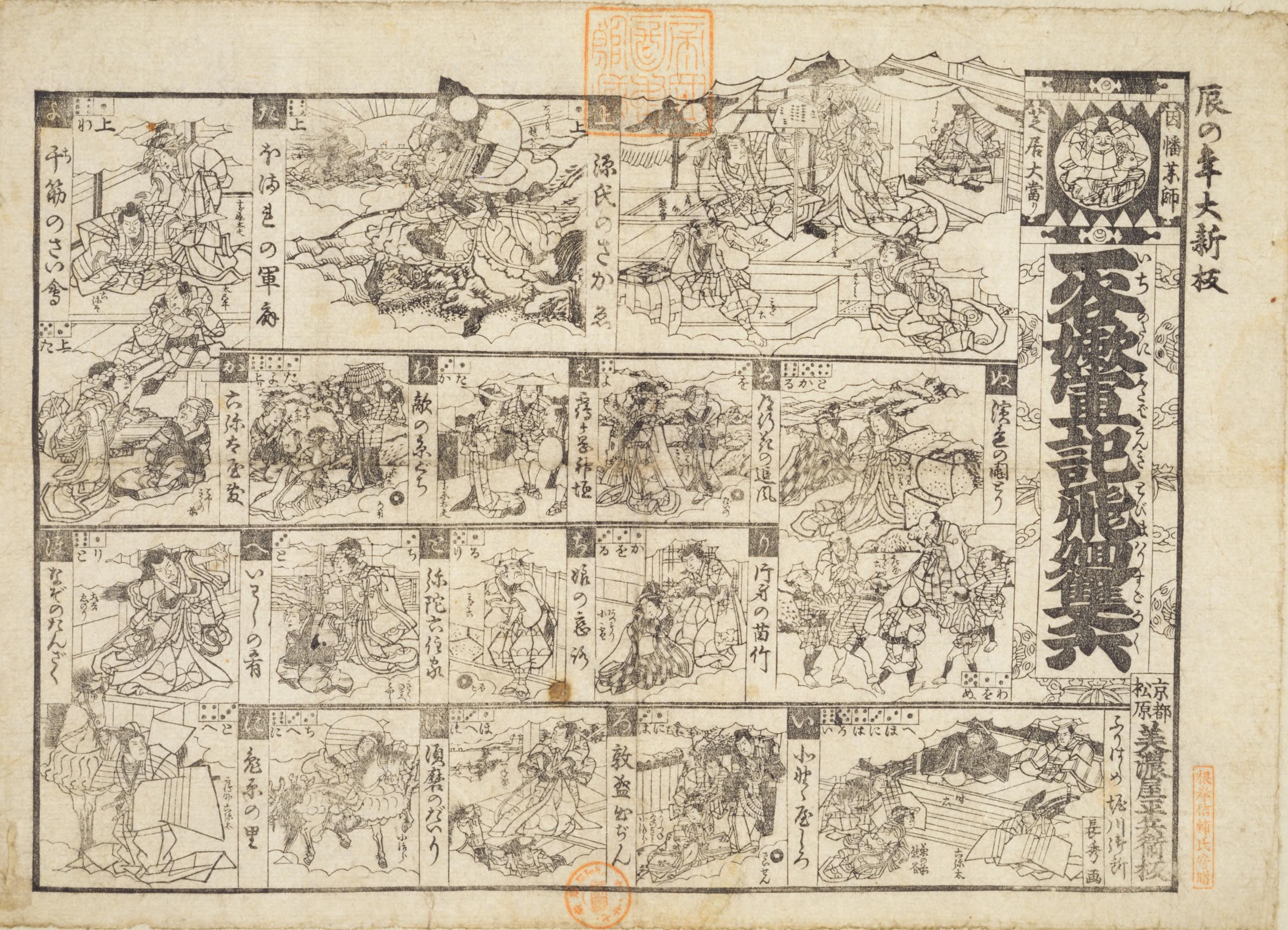
Print from the picture album "Sugoroku"
