= Shunkōsai Hokushū =

19th-century Japanese painter

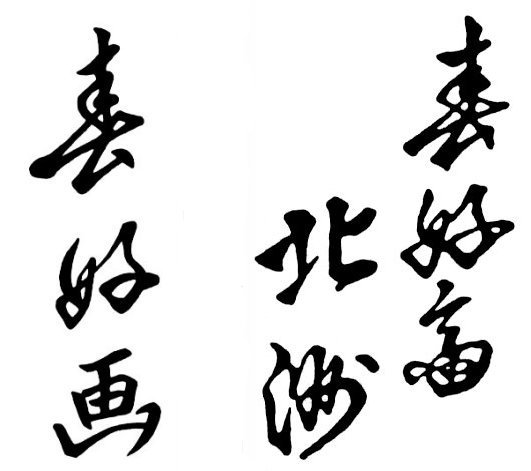
Signatures of Shunkōsai Hokushū from left to right: “Shunkō ga” (春好 画) and “Shunkōsai Hokushū” (春好斎 北洲)

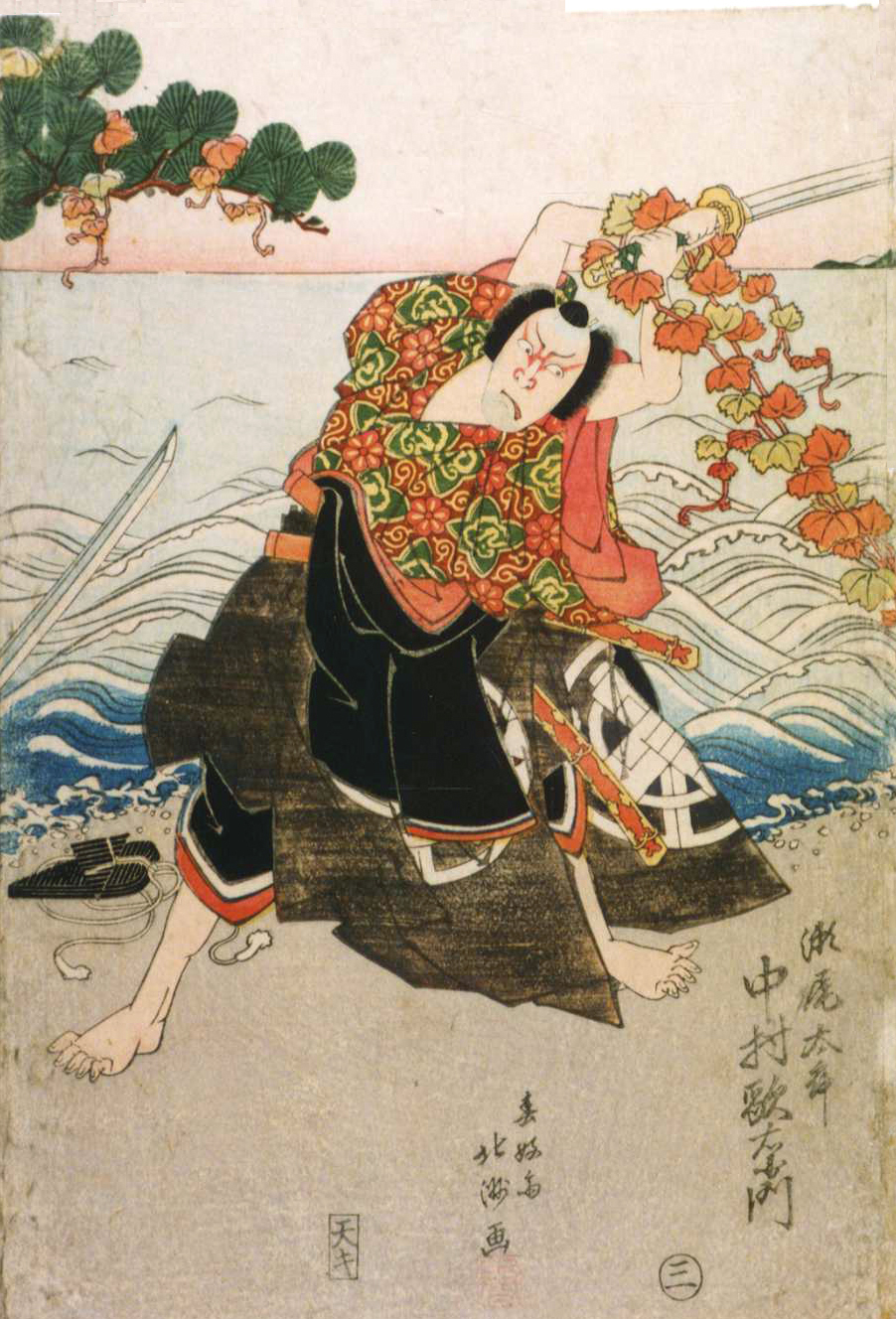
Woodblock print of kabuki actor Nakamura Utaemon III as Seno-o no Tarō

Shunkōsai Hokushū (春好斎 北洲), who is also known as Shunkō IV, was a designer of ukiyo-e style Japanese woodblock prints in Osaka who was active from about 1802 to 1832. He is known to have been a student of Shōkōsai Hambei, and may have also studied with Hokusai. He used the name Shunkō (春好) until 1818, when he changed his name to Shunkōsai Hokushū. He was the most important artist in Osaka during the 1810s and 1820s and established the Osaka style of actor prints.

Over his career Hokushū used five signatures: Shunkō from January 1802 to January 1818; Shunkōsai, alone or together with Hokushū, from August 1809 to January 1818; Shōkōsai for a single print in September 1811, on which he included an aratame announcing his change of name to Shōkōsai II; Sekkatei, in 1819 as a proofreading copyist for Hokusai's ehon Denshin Kaishu Hokusai Gashiki, and again in 1822 on two single-sheet prints; and finally Hokushū alone from January 1818 until the end of his career. He also used two literary names, Shikan until 1 January 1825 and Baigyoku from November 1825.

Hokushū's earliest known single-sheet print is a hosoban from January 1802, bearing a poem signed by his teacher Shōkōsai, depicting Ōtani Tomoemon II as Inokuma Monbei in Keisei Kuruwa Genji at Osaka's Naka Theatre; a puzzling gap follows, with no prints known to survive from between 1802 and 1807. In his early period, from September 1807 to January 1819, Hokushū collaborated with the publisher Shioya Chōbei; afterward, he worked most frequently with Honya Seishichi and Toshikuraya Shinbei, though his work was also published by Yamaichi, Arihado Chūbei, Izutsuya Denbei, Tenmaya Kihei and Wataya Kihei. As recorded in the Naniwa Shoryū Gajin Meika Annai (1831), Hokushū was considered the finest artist of his generation, his work exemplifying the third generation of Osaka printmaking. Among the many actors he portrayed, the outstanding Arashi Kichisaburō II dominated his output until the actor's death in September 1821, after which Kichisaburō's principal rival, Nakamura Utaemon III, strongly captured Hokushū's attention.
