= Harukawa Eizan =

Harukawa Eizan (春川 栄山) was a Japanese designer of ukiyo-e style Japanese woodblock prints who was active in the 1790s. He is believed to have been a student of Chōbunsai Eishi, and was the teacher of Harukawa Goshichi.

Eizan's school reflected the cultural climate of the country following the sumptuary laws of the late 18th century: as controls loosened, his compositions came to feature women heavily made up and dressed in rich, sumptuous garments. His pupil Harukawa Goshichi (1776–1825), a poet as well as a painter, moved from Edo to Kyoto around 1810; among Goshichi's notable works is a contribution to the shunga genre, the ehon Tegoto no Hana, a series of twelve aiban prints depicting twelve erotic scenes involving couples from different social classes, including a courtesan and her client, a middle-aged woman and a priest, and a samurai and a princess. Harukawa Eichō (1784–1848) also studied under Goshichi, and used the names Hosoda, Rekisentei and Shikyūsai, in addition to producing ōkubi-e portraits of notable figures of the Yoshiwara pleasure quarters.

This artist should not be confused with Kikukawa Eizan (1787–1867), a later designer of ukiyo-e woodblock prints.

== Bibliography ==
- Newland, Amy Reigle. (2005). Hotei Encyclopedia of Japanese Woodblock Prints. Amsterdam: Hotei. ISBN 9789074822657; OCLC 61666175
