= Kaigetsudō Ando =

Japanese painter and teacher, 1671–1743

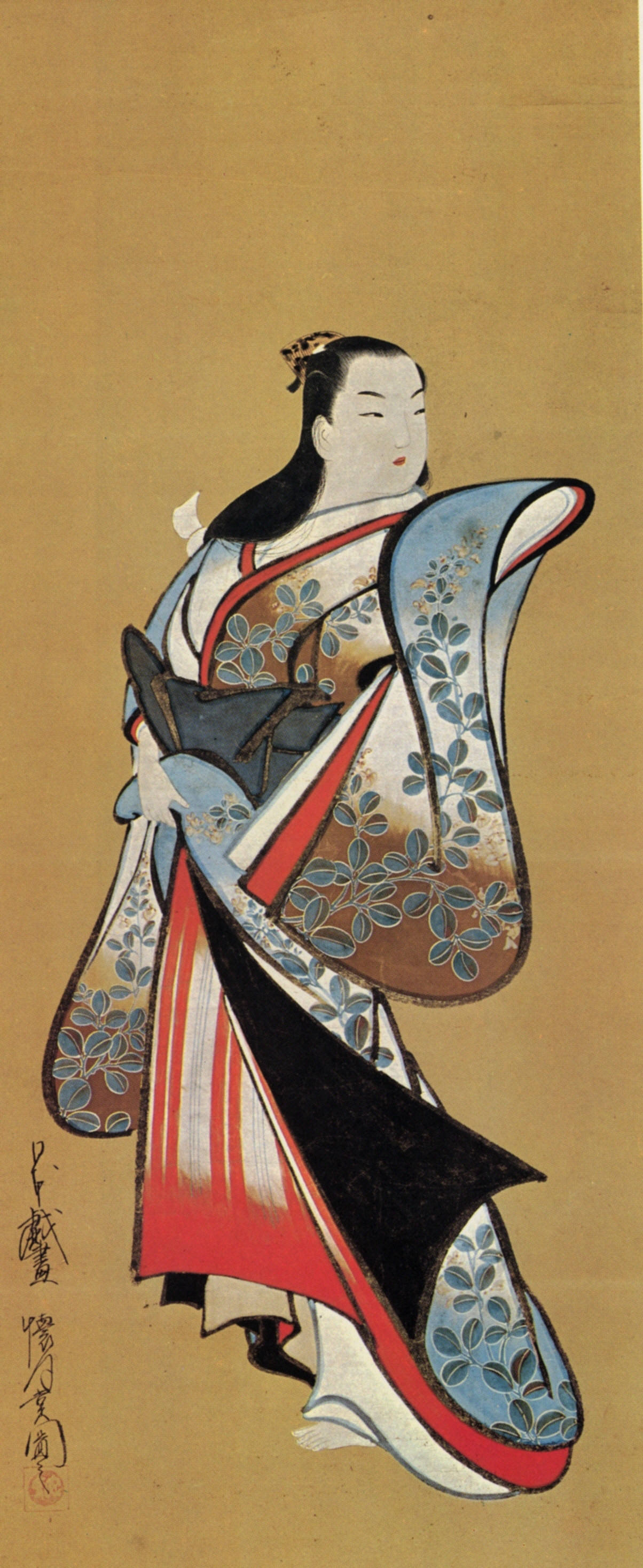
A bijin-ga painting of a courtesan, by Kaigetsudō Ando.

Kaigetsudō Ando (壊月堂安度, c. 1671–1743), also known as Ando Yasunori, was a Japanese painter and the founder of the Kaigetsudō school of ukiyo-e art. The characters of his name, 安度, are read "Ando" following the Sino-Japanese reading, but can also be read "Yasunobu" or "Yasunori" in native Japanese readings; this ambiguity long led to the mistaken belief that these were two distinct artists. Though influential and prolific, it is probable that many of the works attributed to him were painted by his disciples. He is a rarity among major ukiyo-e artists in that he made only paintings and never woodblock prints.

== Biography ==
Ando lived in the Suwa-chō district of Asakusa in Edo (modern Tokyo) near Sensō-ji temple, and on a major road which led to the Yoshiwara north of the city. Principally active from 1700–1714, some scholars have surmised that his early training may have been in ema, wooden votive tablets sold at Shinto shrines. A distinctive element of his style is the sense of emptiness around his figures, an element which fits well with the medium of the ema; this theory is supported by the idea of his location on the main road, where a great number of pilgrims and travelers would have passed daily.

Some scholars dismiss this theory, but it is nevertheless evident that Ando was closely connected to the trends of popular culture, art, and literature at the time. His style shows influences of the father of ukiyo-e painting, Hishikawa Moronobu, and his disciples, as well as influences from book illustrators such as Yoshida Hanbei.

Ando's particular focus was on the bijinga (images of beautiful women), and in his time he and his studio nearly monopolized the production of images of the courtesans of the Yoshiwara, Edo's pleasure district. His style is especially distinguished by the elaborate, and often brilliantly colorful, patterns on the courtesan's kimono. These were truly images of the latest fashions, or perhaps of the artist's own fashion ideas, just as much as they were images of the women. It has also been said that his women had an austerity and aloofness that placed them above pure representations of sexuality, the Edo period equivalent of "pin-ups".

As the founder of a school, it should come as no surprise that his style was fresh, new and innovative, and quite distinctive. This style would be continued by his direct disciples (some of whom were his sons or other direct relations), often so closely that paintings done by them have come to be misattributed to Ando.

Kaigetsudō Ando's career came to an end in 1714, with the so-called "Ejima-Ikushima affair". It is not entirely clear how he was involved in this scandal which revolved around a high ranking court lady and a kabuki actor (who held a very low status in society, along with all actors and entertainers). All those involved were banished from Edo. Ando himself was exiled to the island of Amami Ōshima, off the Izu Peninsula. Eight years later, in 1722, he was granted permission to return to Edo, where he may have resumed his original trade and remained active until around 1736. Experts have been unable to determine precisely when the Kaigetsudō studio itself ceased to exist, although little can be attributed to it beyond 1716. It is known, however, that Ando went on to produce illustrations and to contribute hokku to haikai poetry anthologies under the literary names Kaigetsudō Josen and Kaigetsudō Shisui.

== Further Readings ==
- Lane, Richard. (1978). Images from the Floating World, The Japanese Print. Oxford: Oxford University Press. ISBN 9780192114471; OCLC 5246796
