= Yanagawa Nobusada =

Yanagawa Nobusada's signatures: "Yukinobu ga" (left) and "Nobusada ga" (right)

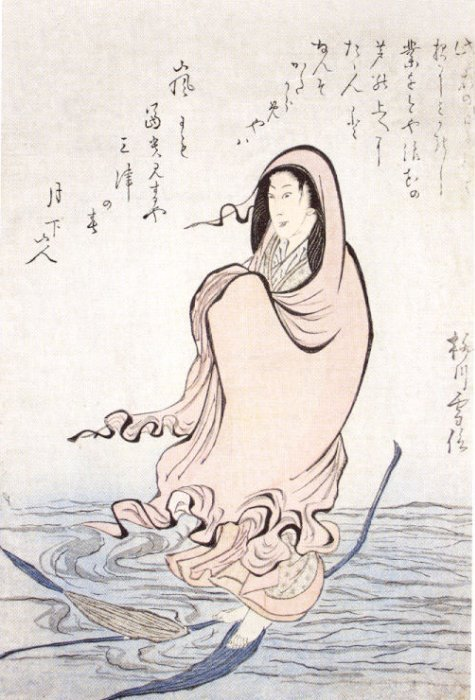
Actor Arashi Tomisaburô as Daruma crossing the Yangtze River on a reed, woodblock print by Yanagawa Nobusada, 1822

Yanagawa Nobusada was a designer of ukiyo-e Japanese woodblock prints in Osaka who was active from about 1822 to 1832. His teacher, Yanagawa Shigenobu, gave him the name Yanagawa Yukinobu. A print from 1823 records the latter's name change from Yukinobu (雪信) to Nobusada (信貞).
