= Hokkei =

Japanese artist (1780–1850)

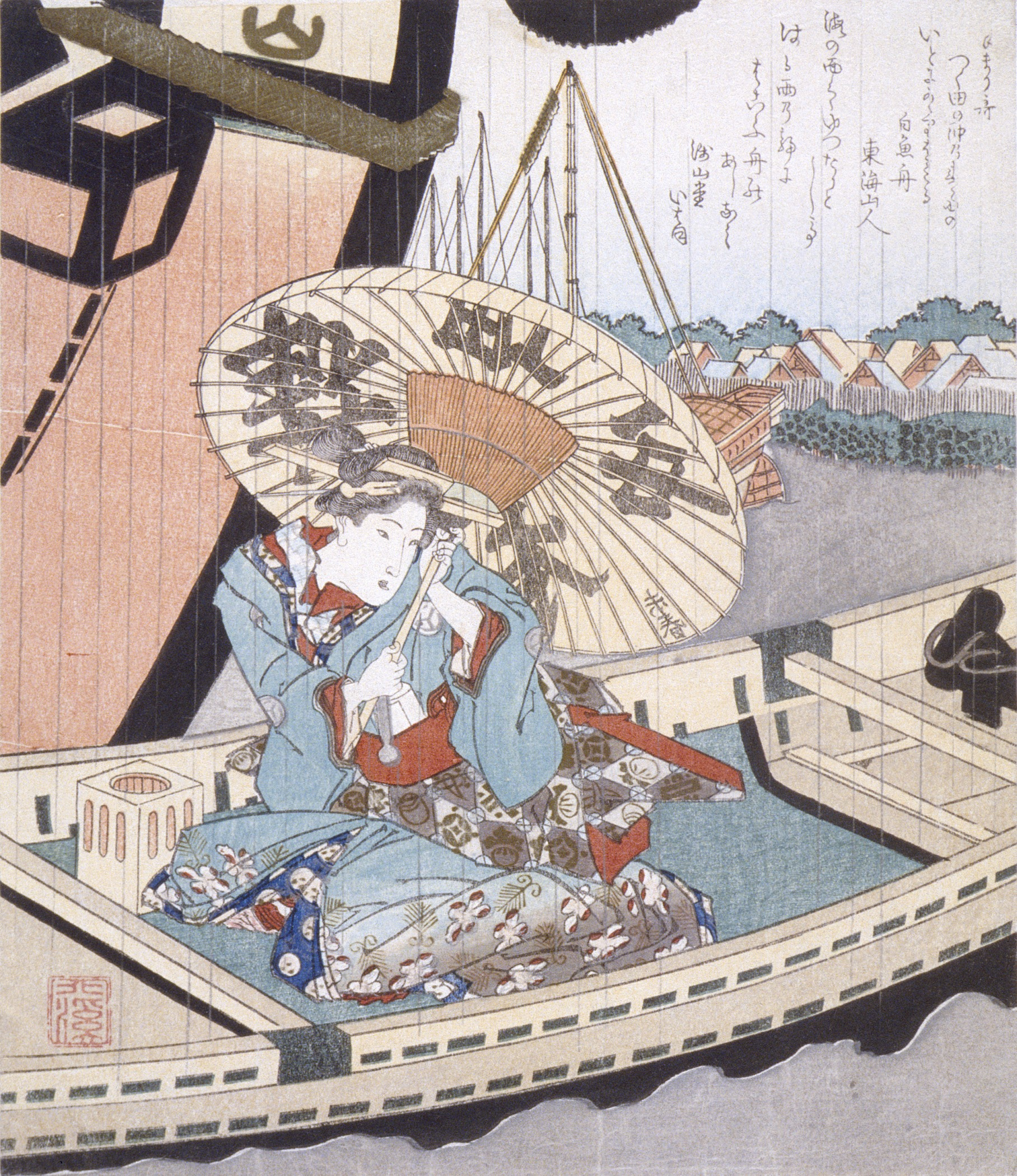
Beauty in a Boat during a Rainstorm, full-colour woodblock print, c. 1804

Totoya Hokkei (魚屋 北渓; 1780–1850) was a Japanese artist best known for his prints in the ukiyo-e style. Hokkei was one of Hokusai's first and best-known students and worked in a variety of styles and genres and produced a large body of work in prints, book illustrations, and paintings. His work also appeared under the art names Aoigazono (葵園), Aoigaoka (葵岡) and Kyōsai (拱斎).

== Life and career ==
Born Iwakubo Tatsuyuki (岩窪 辰行) in 1780 in Edo (modern Tokyo), Hokkei was at first a fishmonger before studying with Kanō Yōsen'in Korenobu, the head of the Kobikichō branch of the Kanō school of painting. Later he became one of ukiyo-e artist Hokusai's first students.

Hokkei's earliest known work appeared about 1800 as illustrations for books of kyōka comic waka poetry, licentious sharebon novels, and hanashibon storybooks. During his peak period in the 1820s and 1830s he produced a large number of prints and book illustration.

Hokkei died in 1850 at age 70. He is buried in Ryūhōji temple in Aoyama. Throughout his life he also used the given names Hatsugorō (初五郎), and Kin'emon (金市右衛門), and the art names Aoigazono (葵園), Aoigaoka (葵岡) and Kyōsai (拱斎). Amongst Hokkei's students are known the names Yashima Gakutei, Nishimoto Keisetsu (西本渓雪), Keiri (渓里), Keiyu (渓由), Keigetsu (渓月), Keishō (渓松), Keisei (渓栖), and Keirin (渓林).

== Style ==
Hokkei's work is light and simple, and shows the influence of his master Hokusai: the Famous Places from Various Provinces series appeared shortly after Hokusai's popular Thirty-six Views of Mount Fuji. Hokkei was an individualistic and versatile artist who made use of a variety of approaches and worked in styles varying from those remiscent of early ukiyo-e artist Hishikawa Moronobu to Western-tinged methods and subjects.

In the 1820s and 1830s Hokkei was a prolific illustrator of surimono prints, of which he made at least eight hundred; and of books, of which he illustrated about a hundred, including erotica and a book of sketches called Hokkei Manga (北渓漫画) in the manner of the Hokusai Manga.

A representative work is Hokkei's illustrations for the kokkeibon comic novel by Ishikawa Masamochi Hokuri Jūniji ("The Twelve Hours of the Northern Village", referring to the pleasure district of Yoshiwara). He produced few print series, one of which is the Famous Places from Various Provinces (諸国名所, Shokoku meisho) of fifteen prints in 1835–36. He also produced full-colour nishiki-e prints in a wide variety of genres, such as musha-e warrior prints and bijin-ga portraits of beauties, and made nikuhitsuga paintings.

Prints by Totoya Hokkei

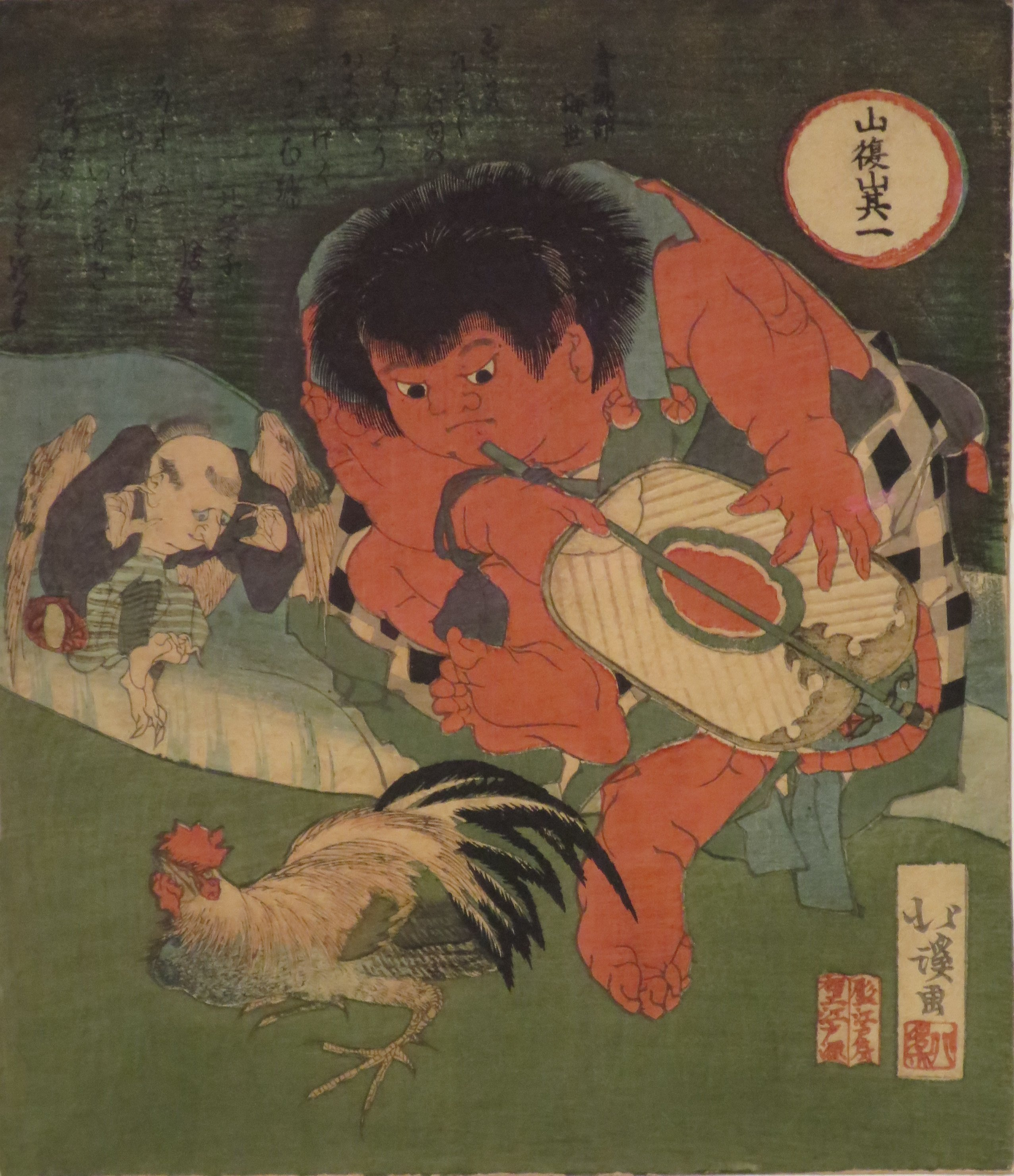
Kintarō Referees a Match between Rooster and Tengu, early 19th century

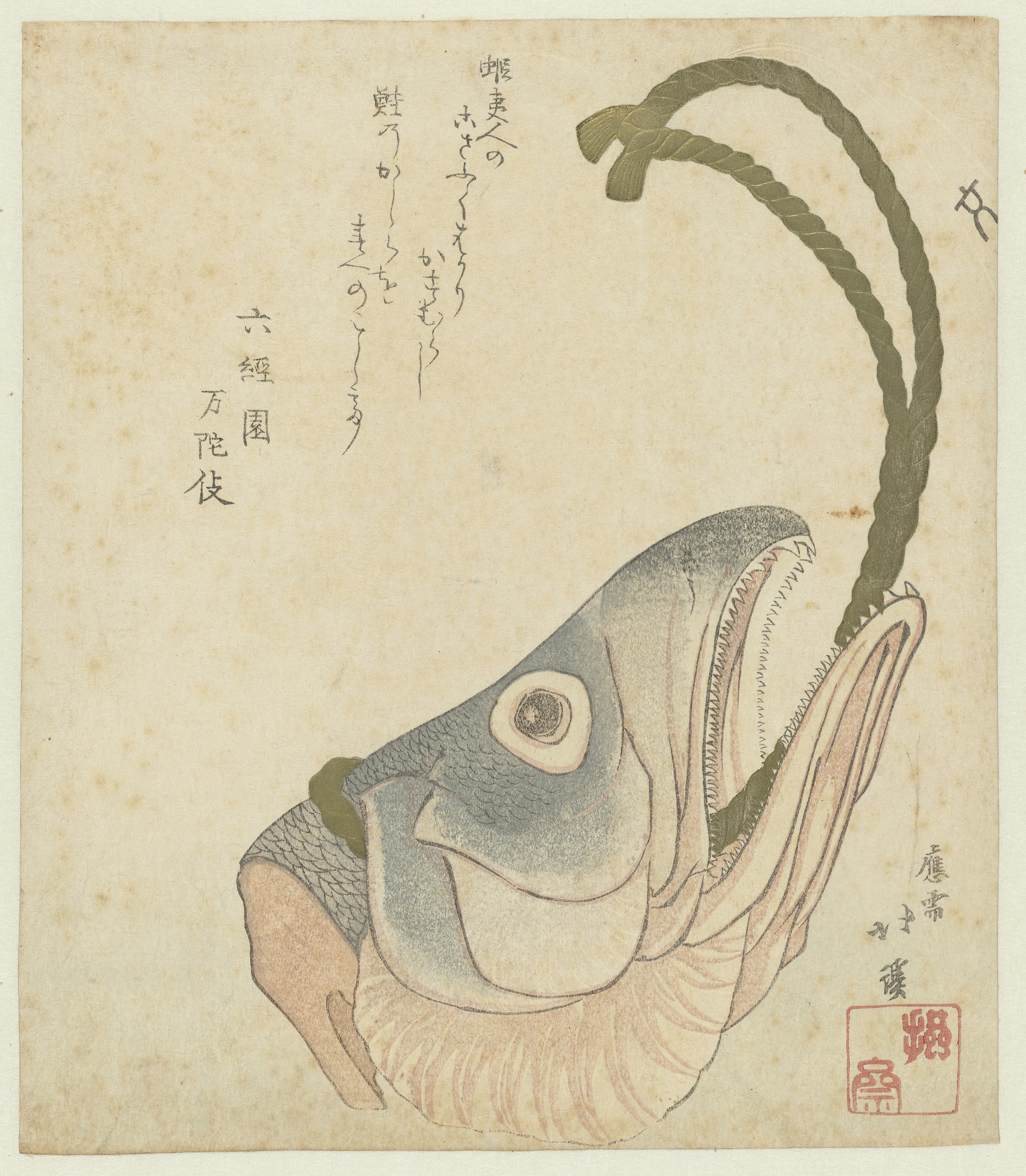
Head of a Salmon, c. 1815–25

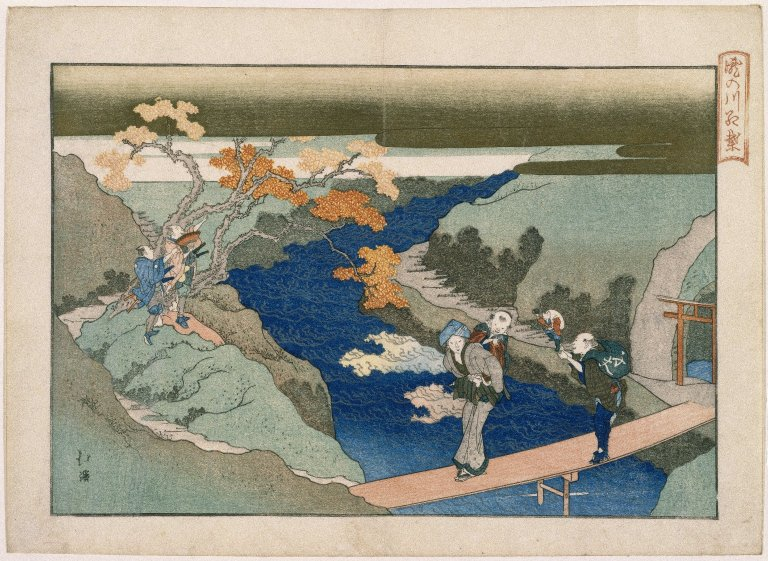
Autumn Maples at the Takinogawa River, c. 1820–40

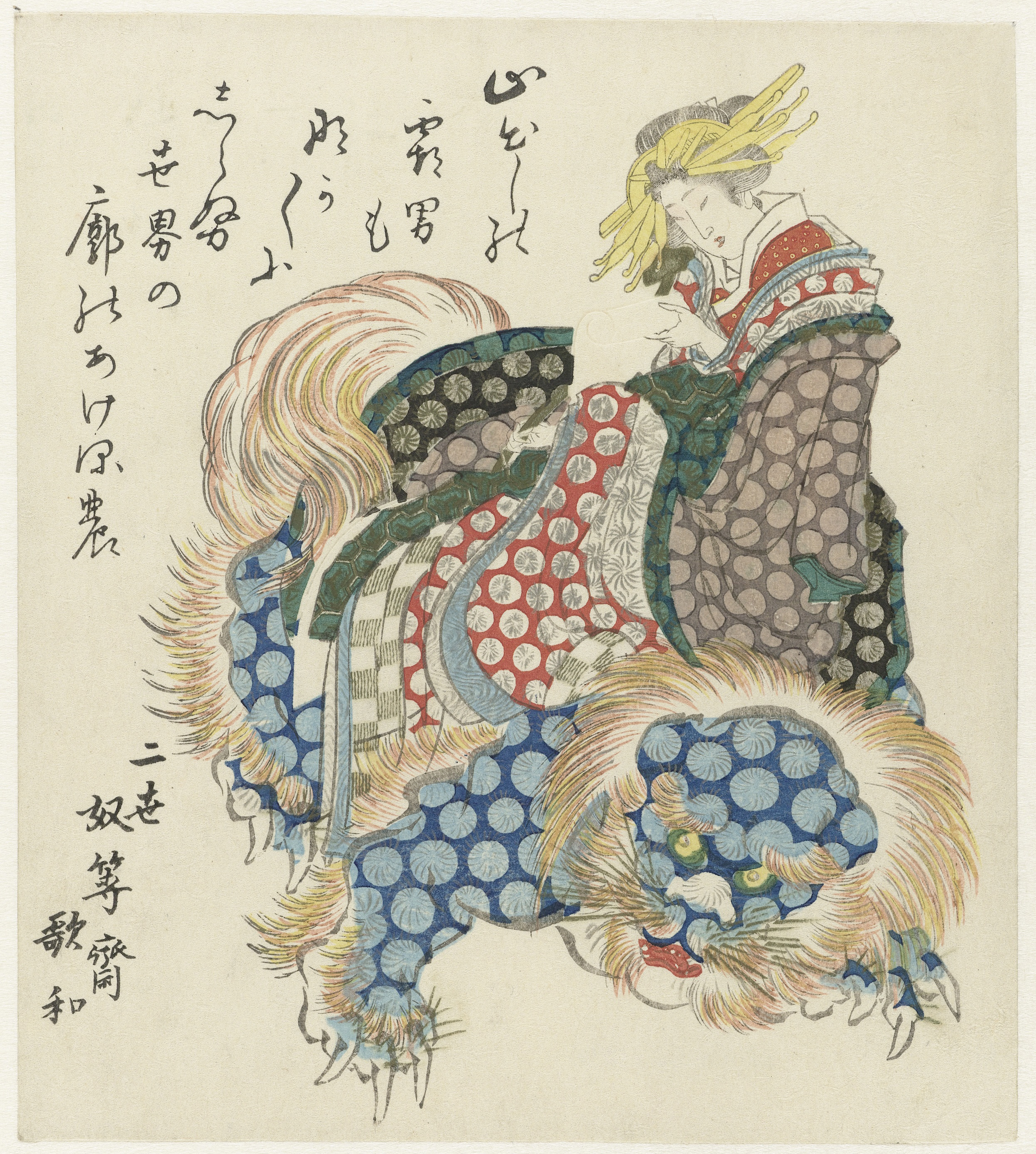
Courtesan Riding a Lion, c. 1830s
Selections from Hokkei Manga

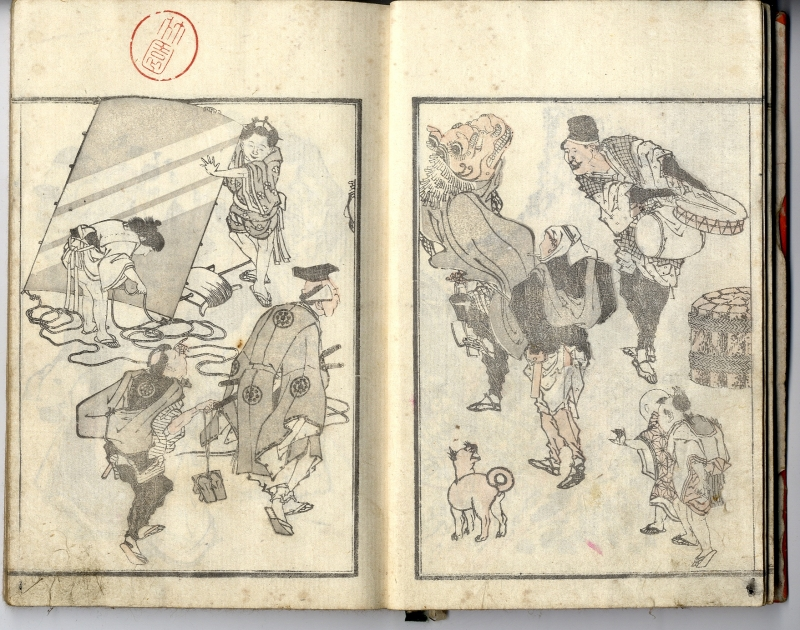

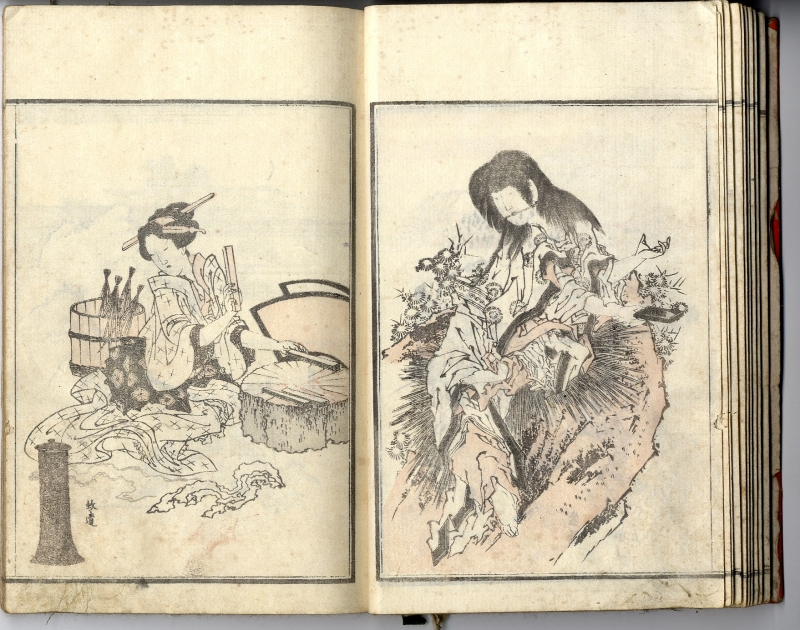

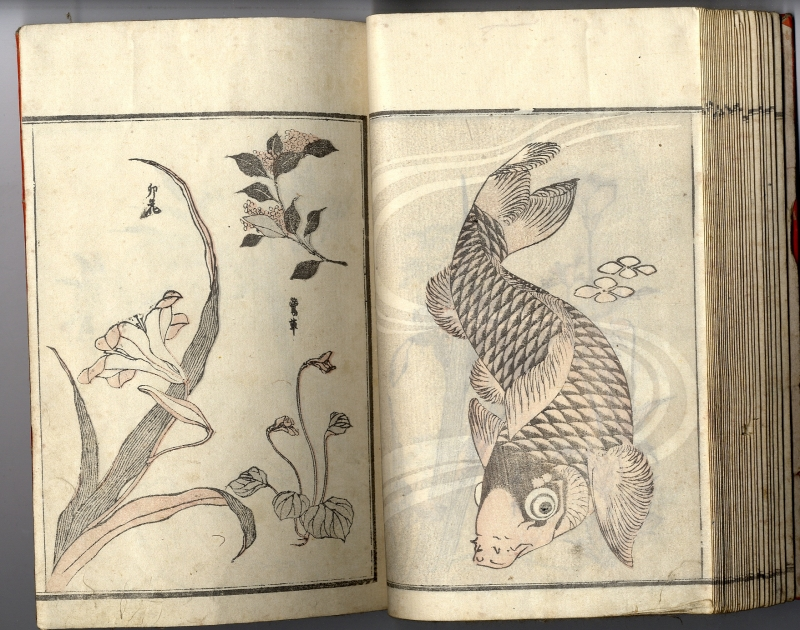
