= Carp and Pine =

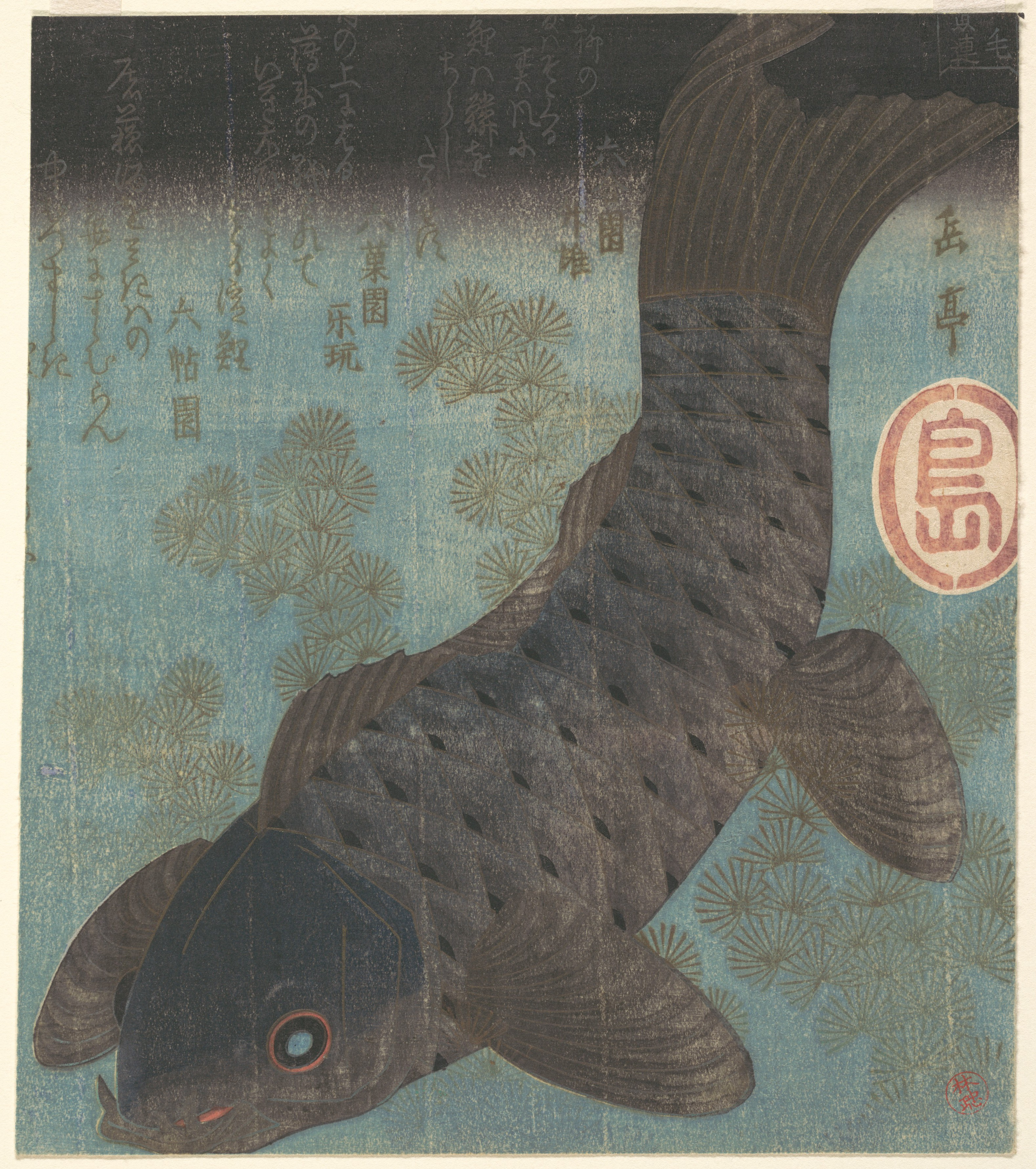
- Artist: Yashima Gakutei
- Year: 1786–1868
- Medium: ink and color on paper
- Dimensions: 20 cm × 17.5 cm (7.9 in × 6.9 in)
- Location: Metropolitan Museum of Art; New York City

Carp and Pine is an Edo period Japanese woodblock print. Created on commission for a club in Kamige by Yashima Gakutei, the work depicts a dark-scaled carp resting in muddy water. The work, which is in the collection of the Metropolitan Museum of Art, was described by the museum as "the quintessential fish surimono."
