= Yashima Gakutei =

Japanese artist and poet

- Born: c. 1786; Osaka, Japan
- Died: 1868 (aged 81–82)
- Education: Hokusai; Hokkei
- Known for: Woodblock printing; Illustration
- Movement: Ukiyo-e

Yashima Gakutei (Japanese: 八島岳亭; c. 1786 – 1868) was a Japanese artist and poet who was a pupil of both Totoya Hokkei and Hokusai. Gakutei is best known for his kyōka poetry and surimono works.

== Biography ==
Gakutei was born in Osaka around 1786, though his exact year of birth is somewhat unclear. He was the illegitimate son of the samurai known as Hirata who served under the Tokugawa shogunate. Gakutei's mother later married into the Yashima clan, explaining the artist's name. For some time, he worked in Osaka, focusing chiefly on privately commissioned woodblock prints called surimono in addition to book illustrations. Most of what is known about Gakutei has been surmised from the subjects and context of his work.

== Works ==
Gakutei is noted for the quality in his wood printing works and for his general contributions to the body of ukiyo-e artwork. Specifically, critics have noted his technical prowess and precision, his skill in embossing, and that his specialization in surimono exceeded that of his teacher, Hokkei. Some of his work included a set of five woodblock prints featuring young women performing gagaku, a traditional kind of court music from the Heian period. Each woman plays an instrument: a reed called a shō, a woodwind called a ryūteki, a koto, a stringed instrument called a biwa, and a drum called a tsuri-daiko. Gakutei also illustrated an entire book called the Kyōka Suikoden (狂歌水滸伝) related to the translated Chinese novel Suikoden. Gakutei also created landscapes and seascapes for books, which are rare pieces amongst Hokusai's pupils.

Gakutei is also known for his prolific writing; he wrote many humorous poems called kyōka and used them in his artwork and prints. Additionally, he was responsible for a Japanese translation of Journey to the West, for which he also completed illustrations.

== Gallery ==
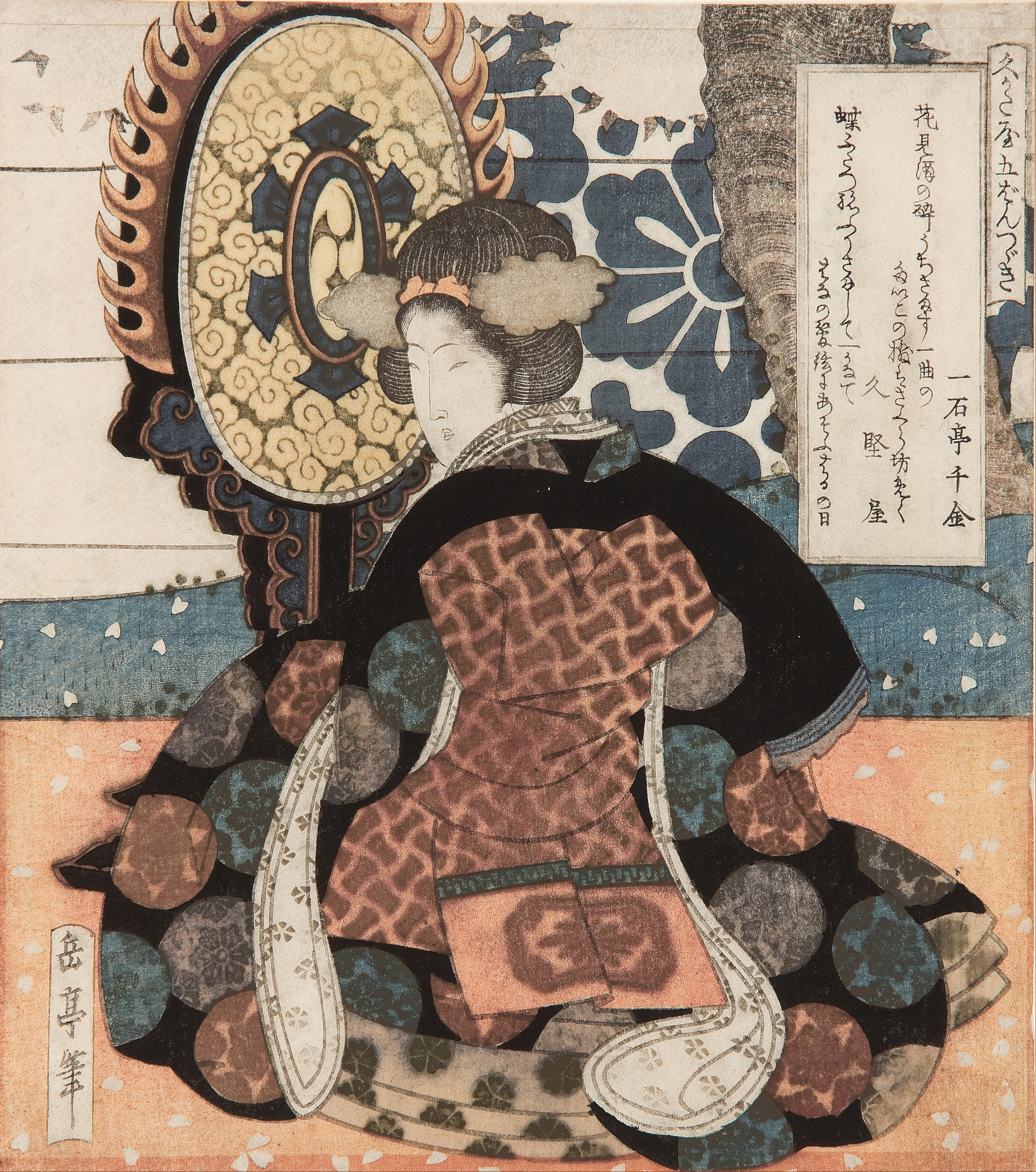
Woman Playing a Large Suspended Drum, a surimono woodblock print, circa 1827.

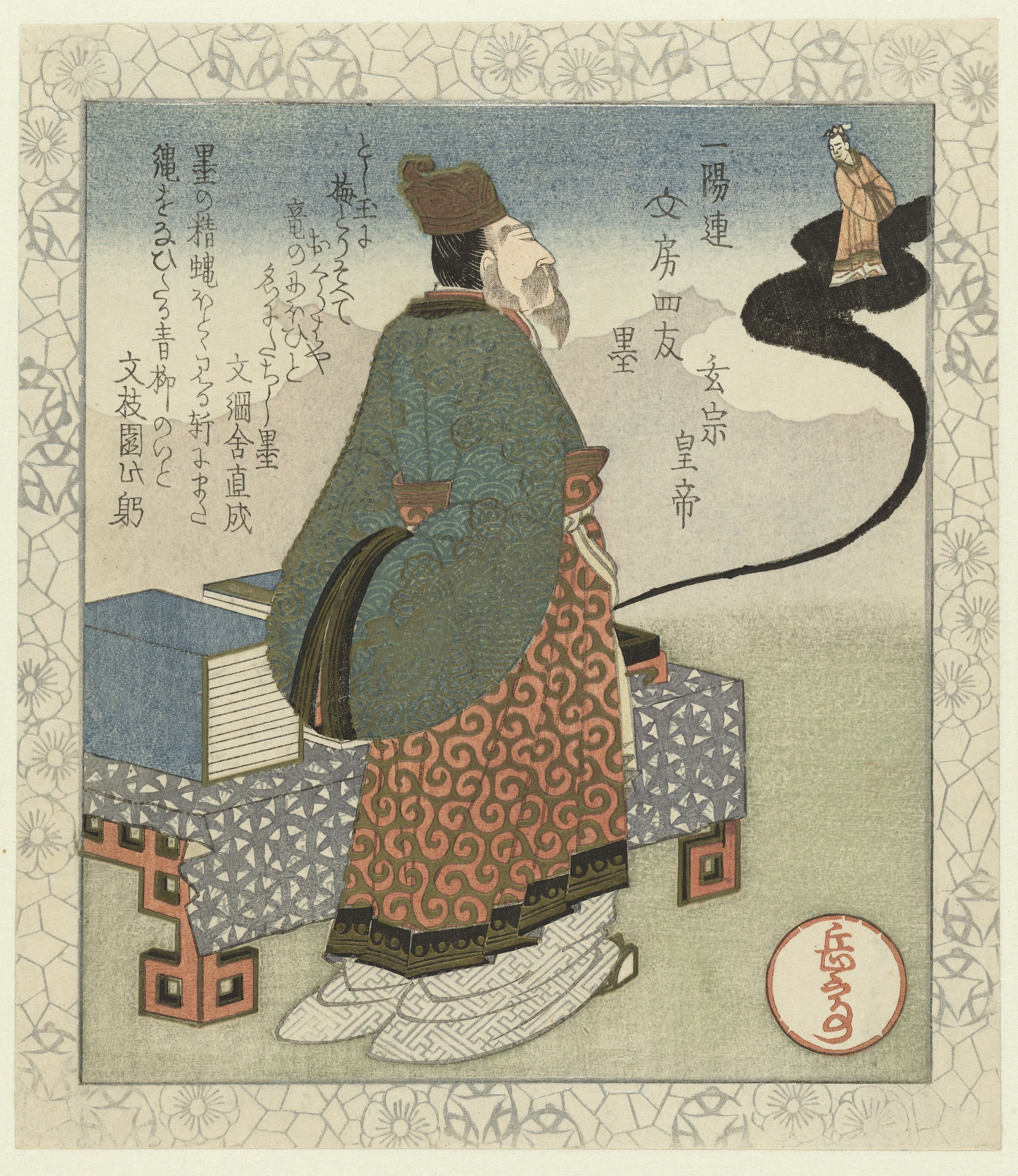
Emperor Xuanzong Watches a Woman Emerge from the Ink. Circa 1827.

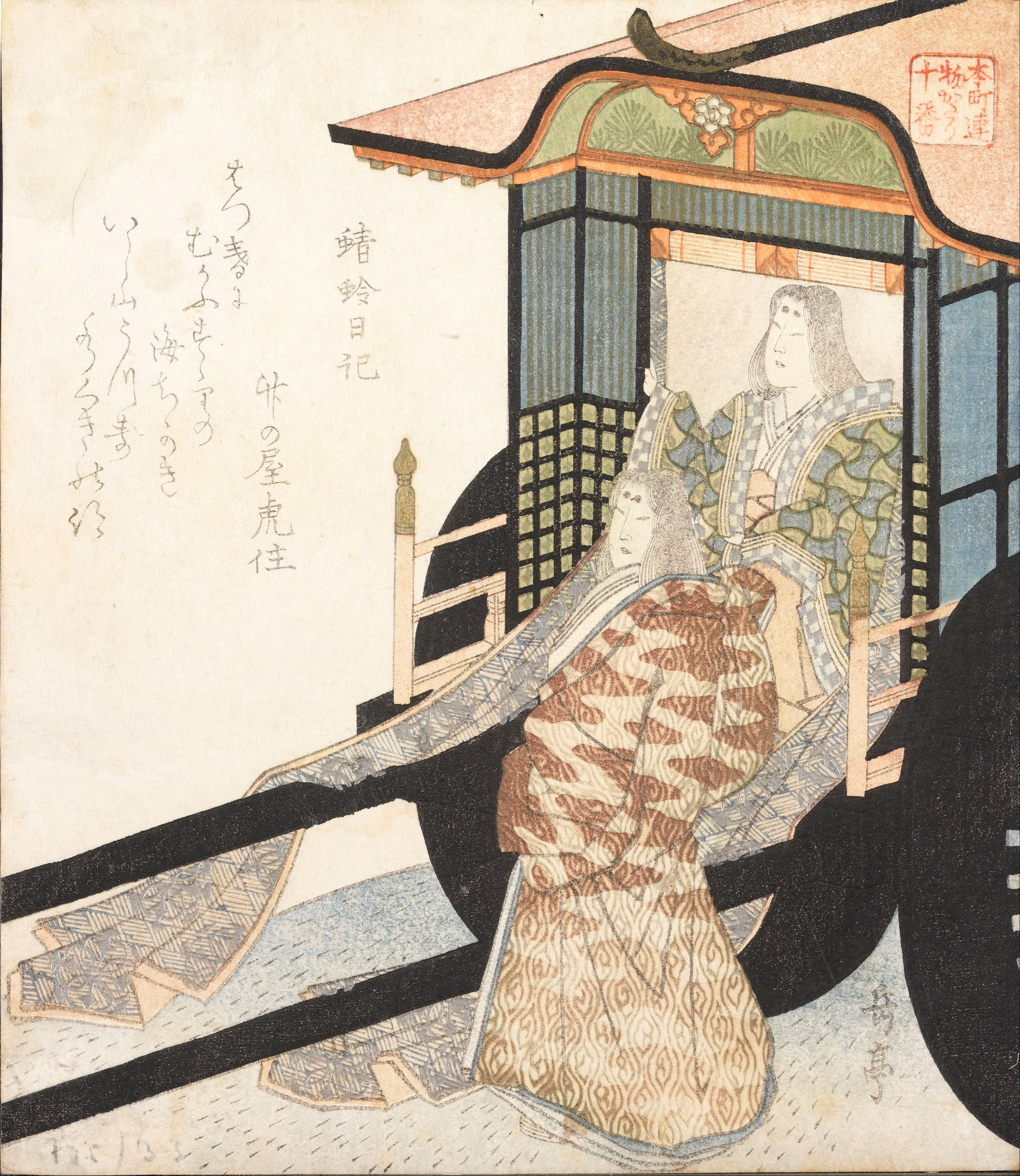
Scene from the Kagerō Nikki. Woodblock print embossed on paper, circa 19th century.

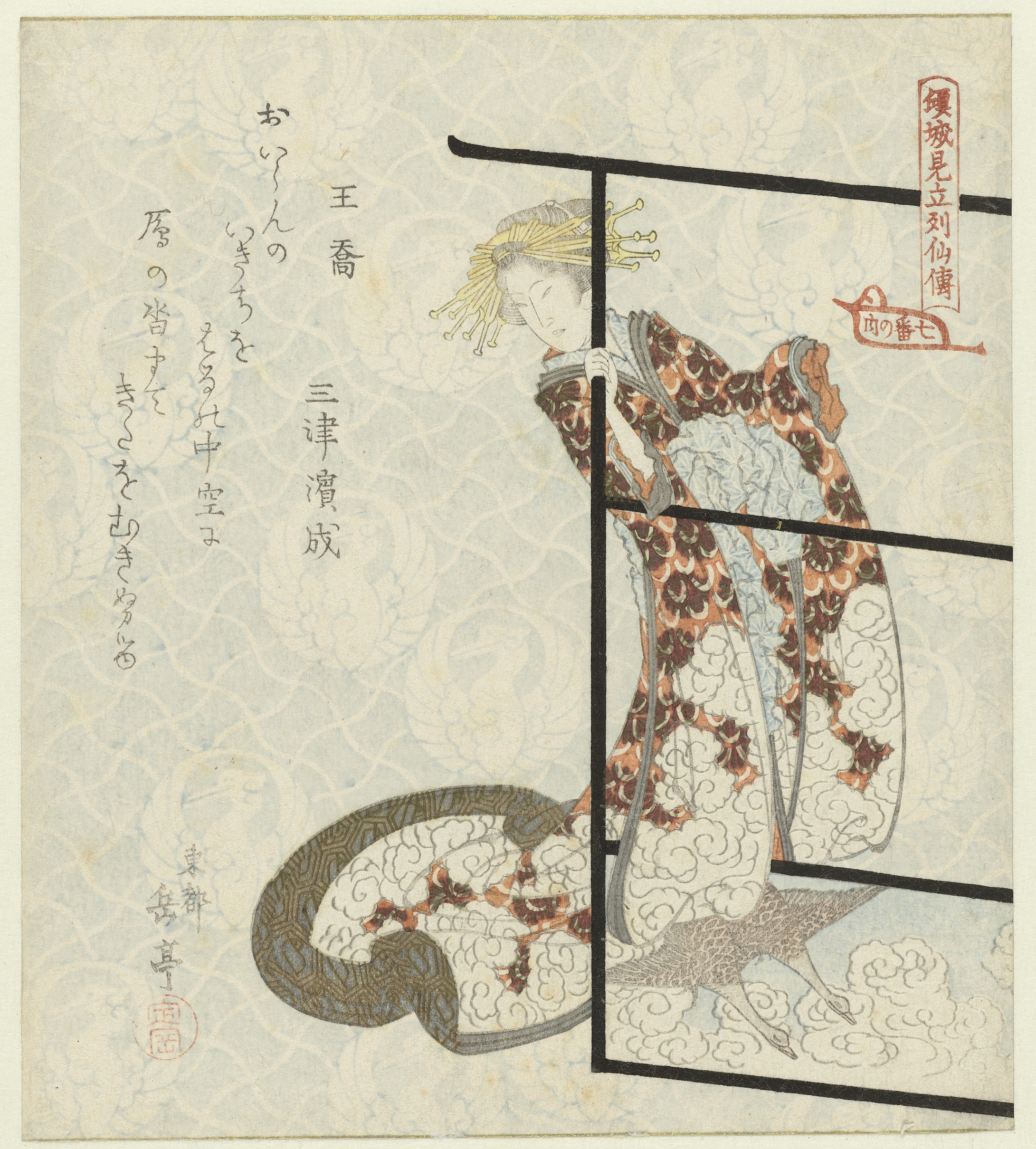
Sennin Ōkyō. Woodblock print, 1821-1822.

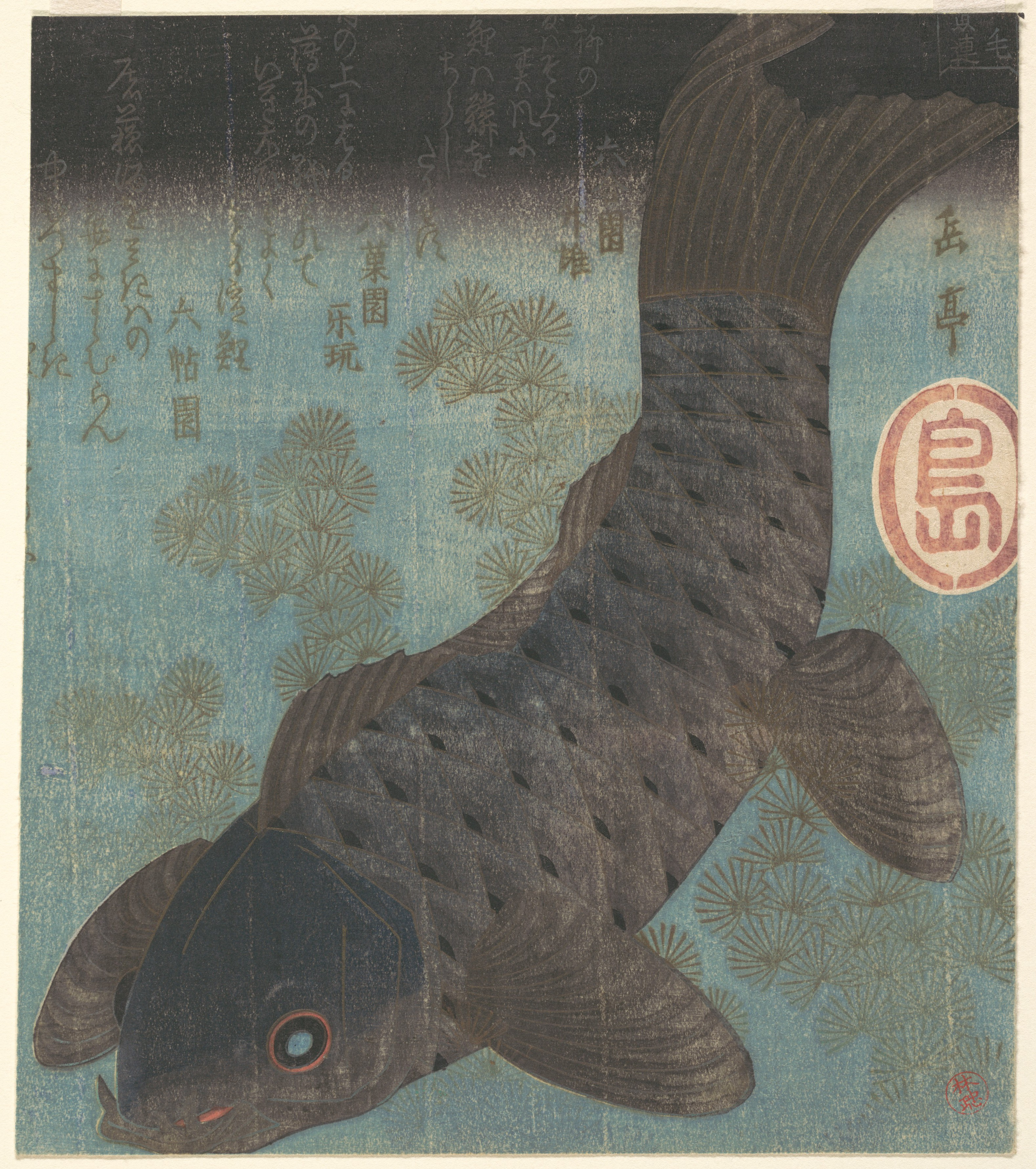
Carp and Pine. Woodblock print produced on commission for a friends club in Kamige.

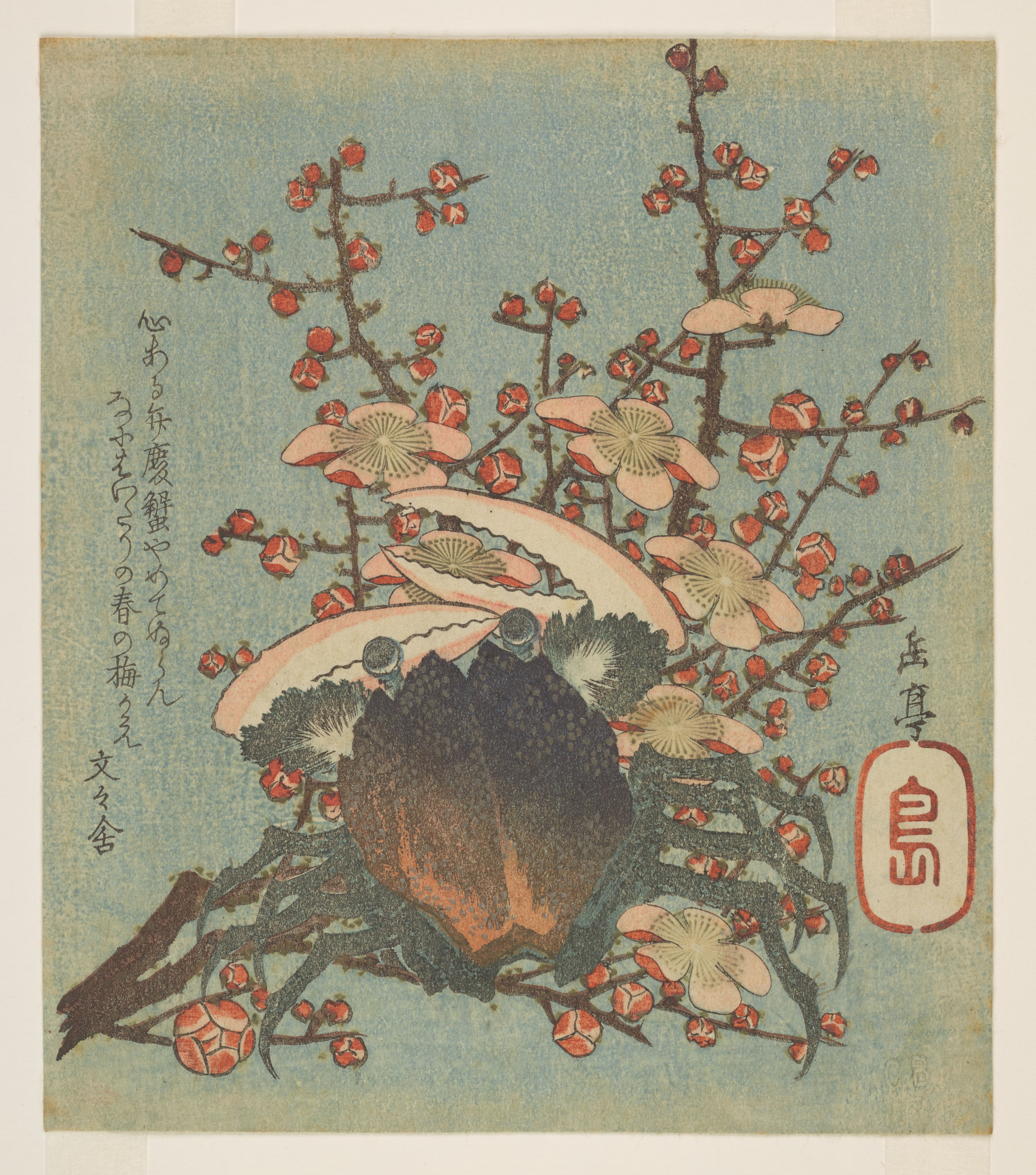
Benkei crab and plum blossom. Woodblock print, c. 1823

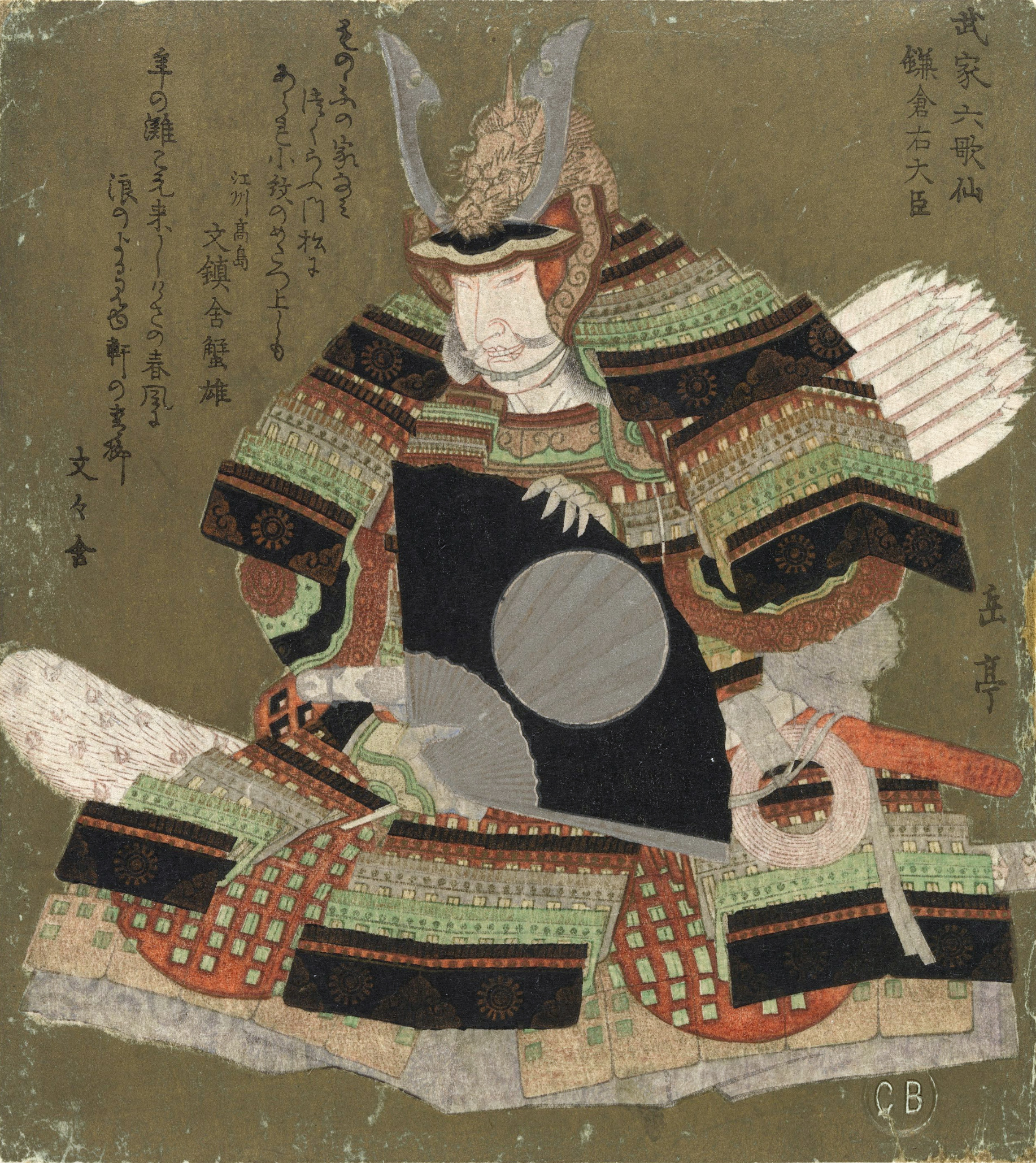
The shogun Minamoto no Sanetomo. Circa 1825.

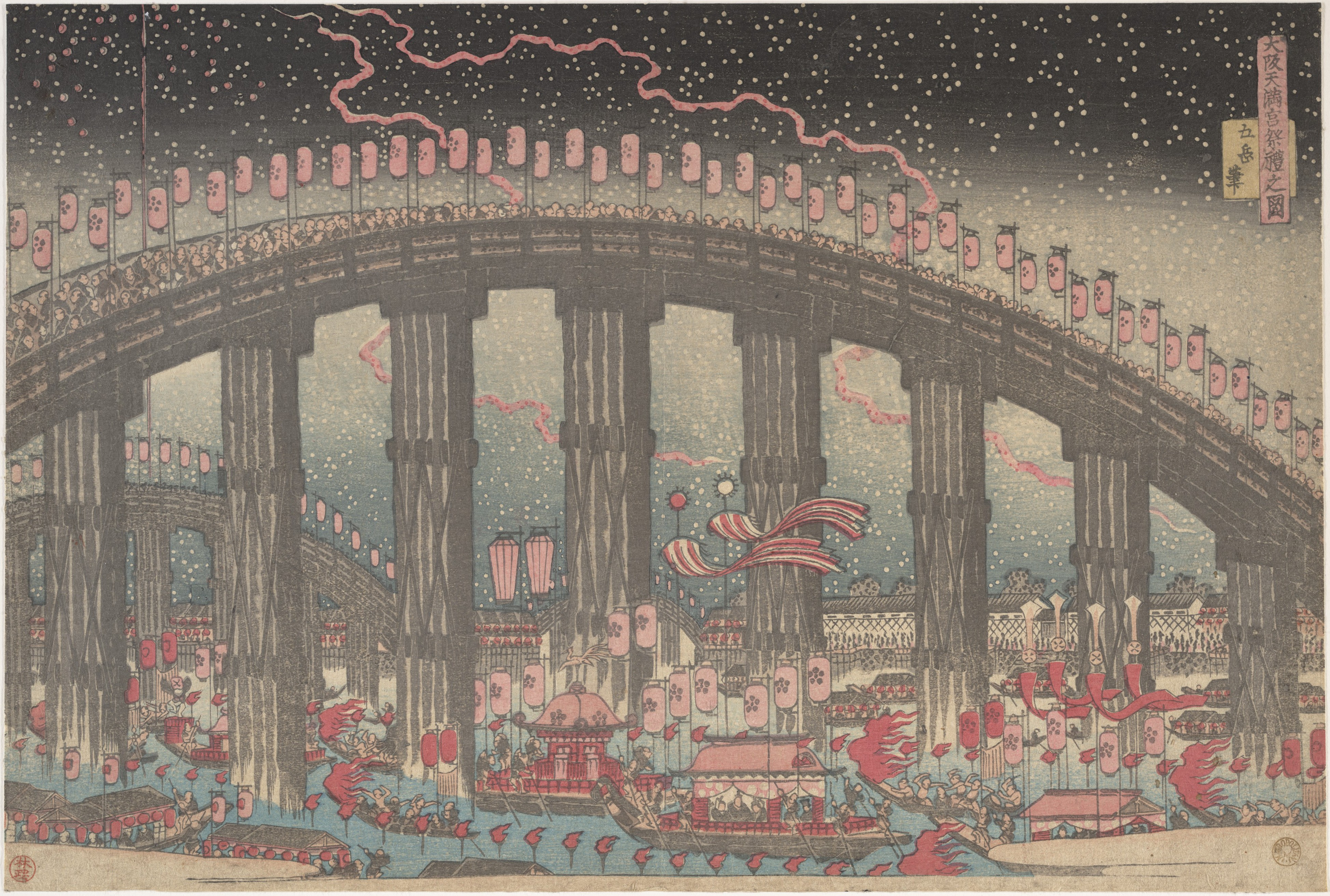
The Tenmangū Festival at Osaka. 1834.

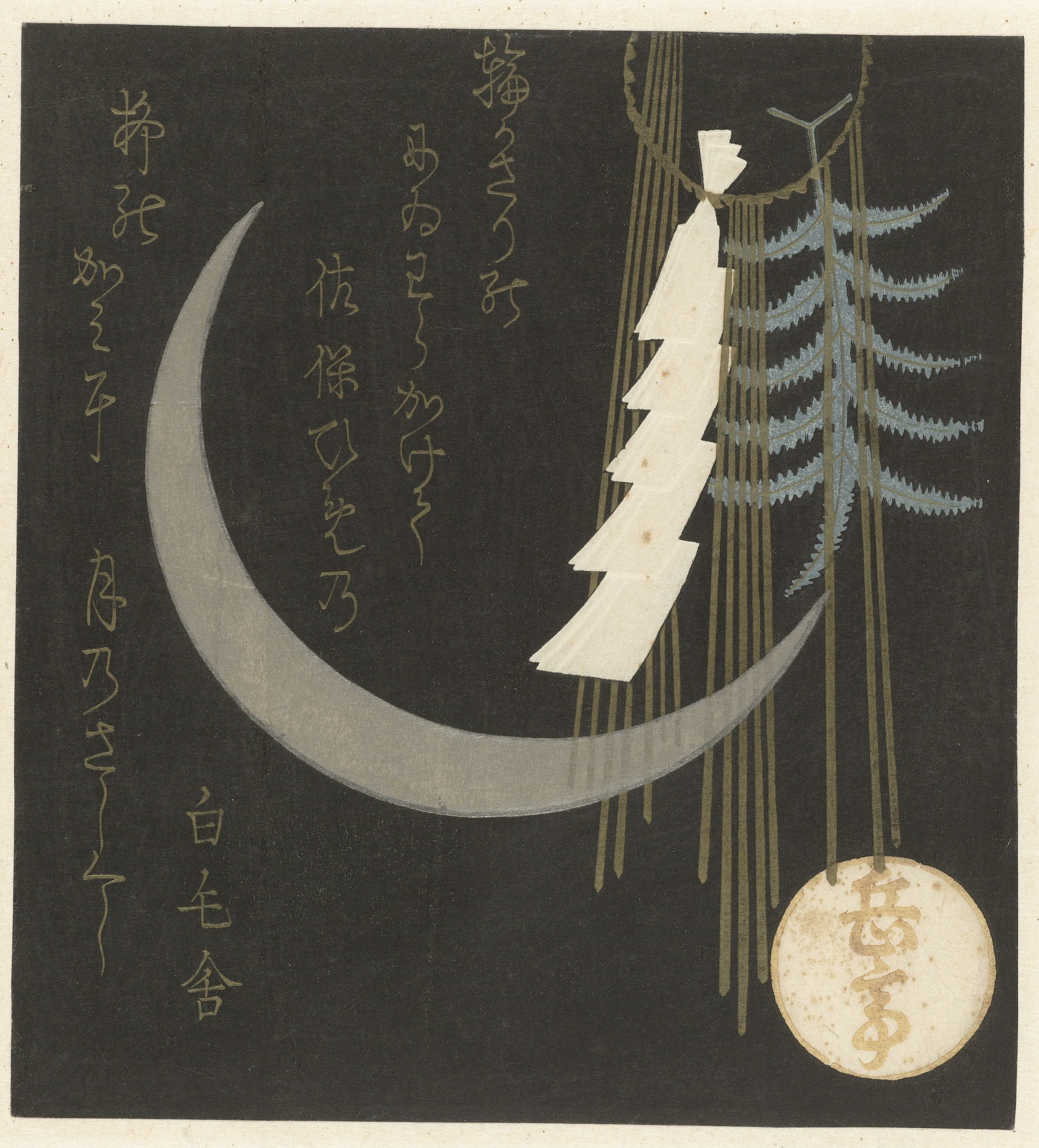
Crescent Moon and New Years Decorations. 1826.

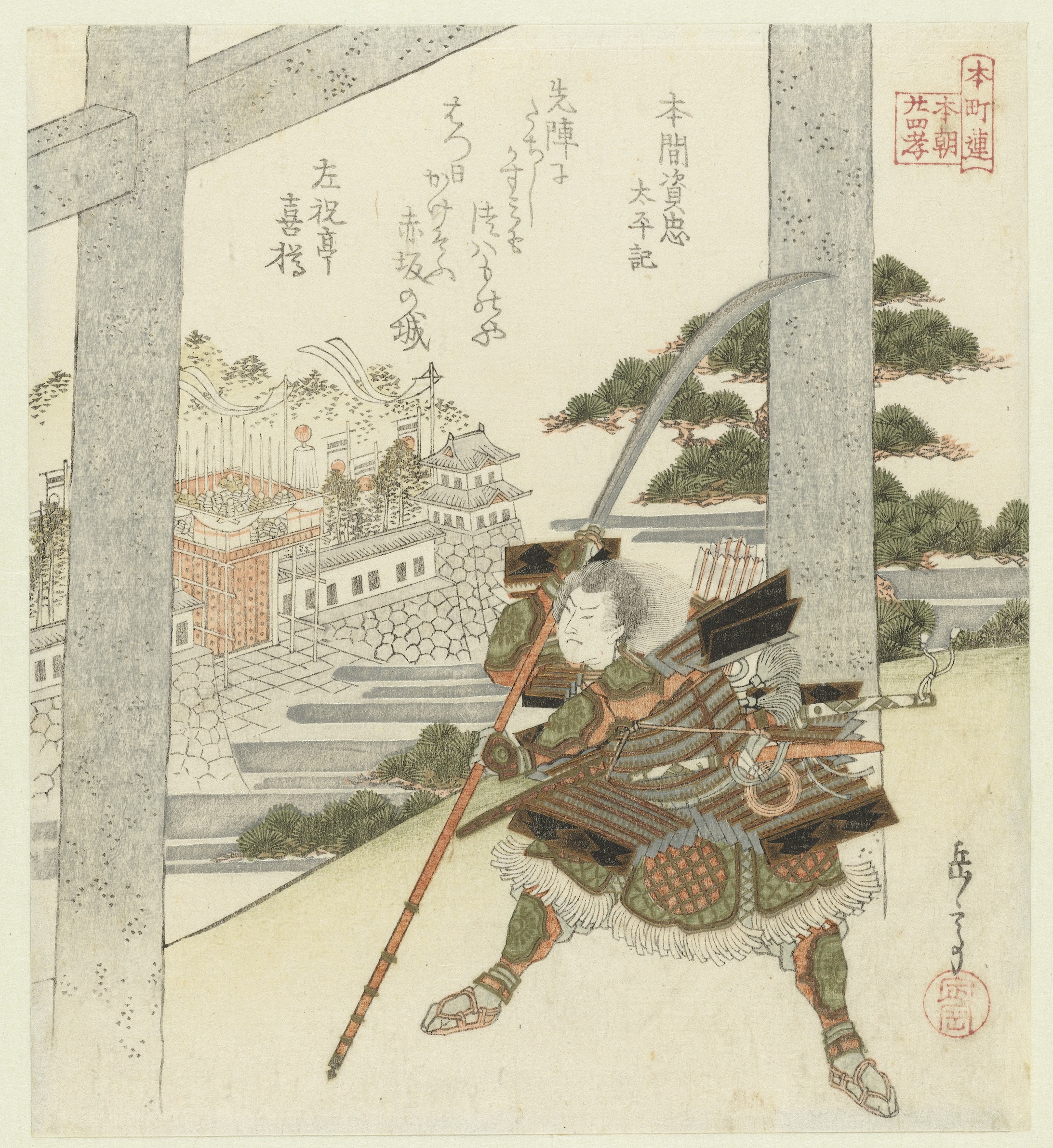
Honma Suketada from the Taiheiki. 1821-1825.

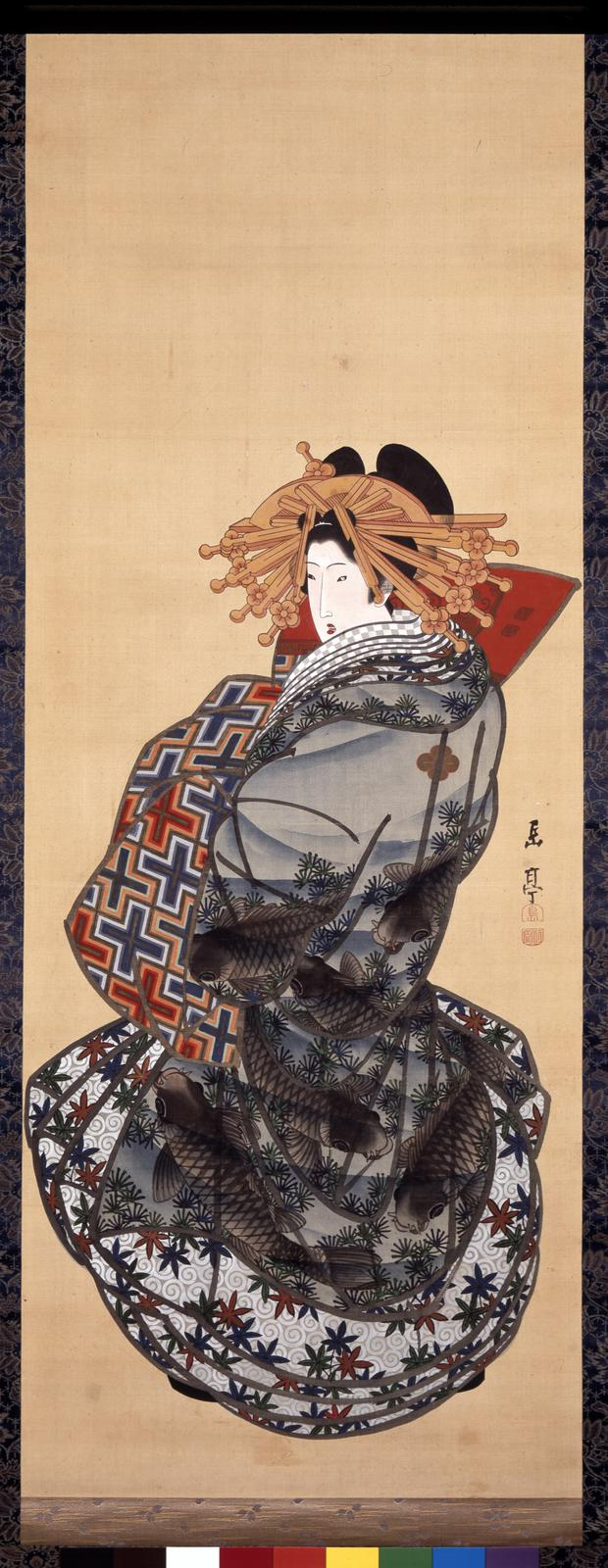
Painted scroll of a courtesan. 1818-1830.

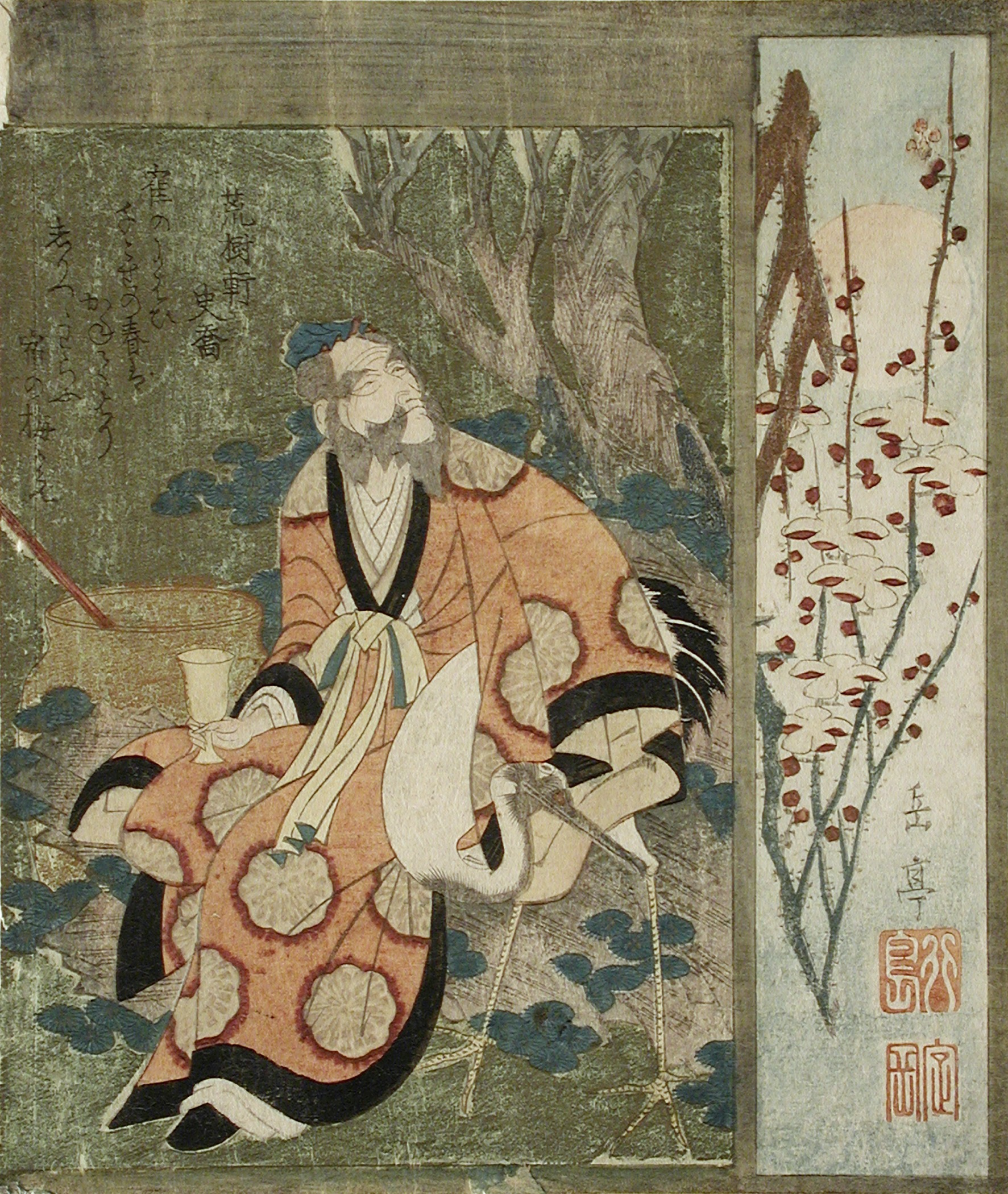
Daoist Immortal and Crane.

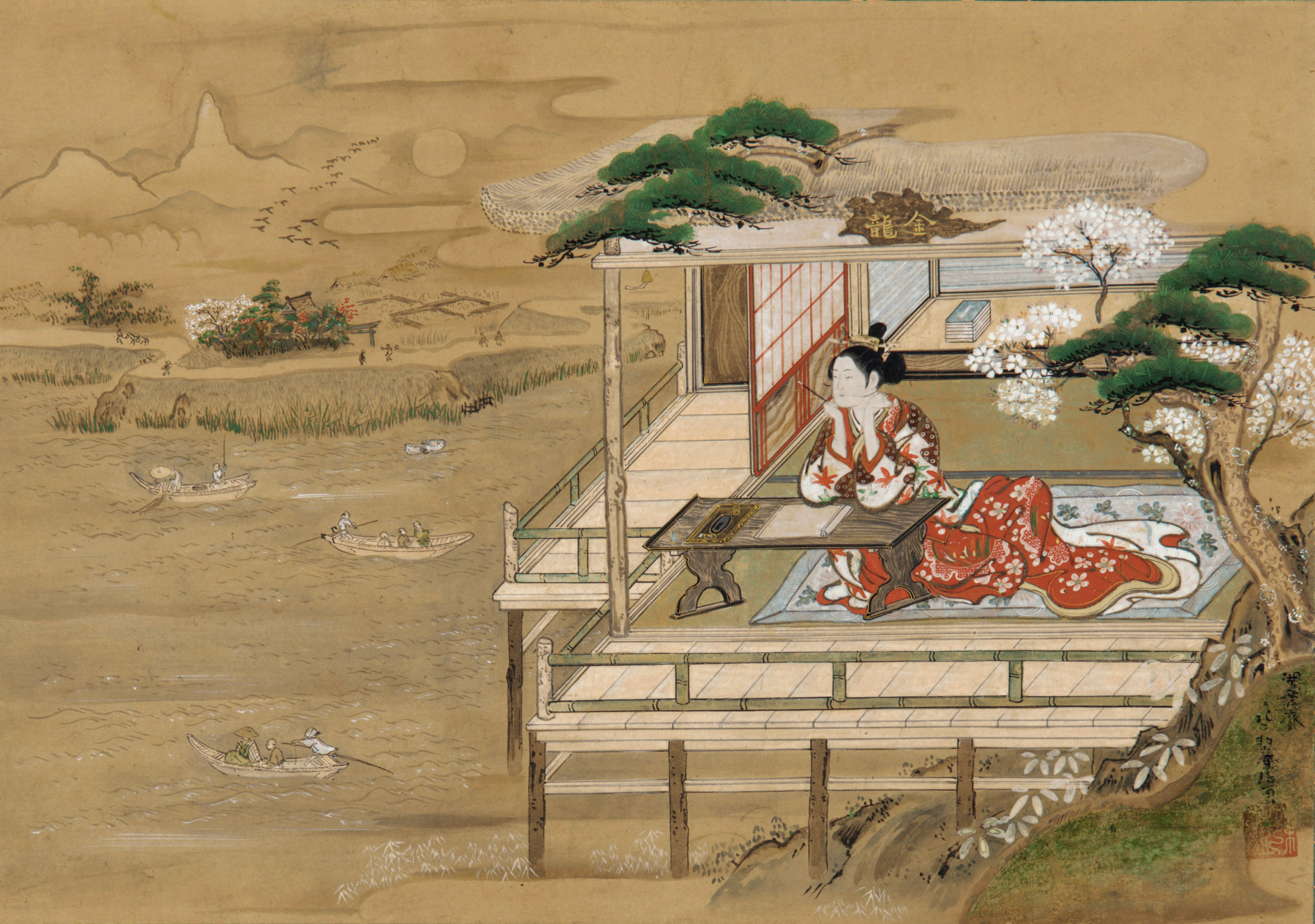
Murasaki Shikibu composing The Tale of Genji.
