= Surimono =

Japanese woodblock prints

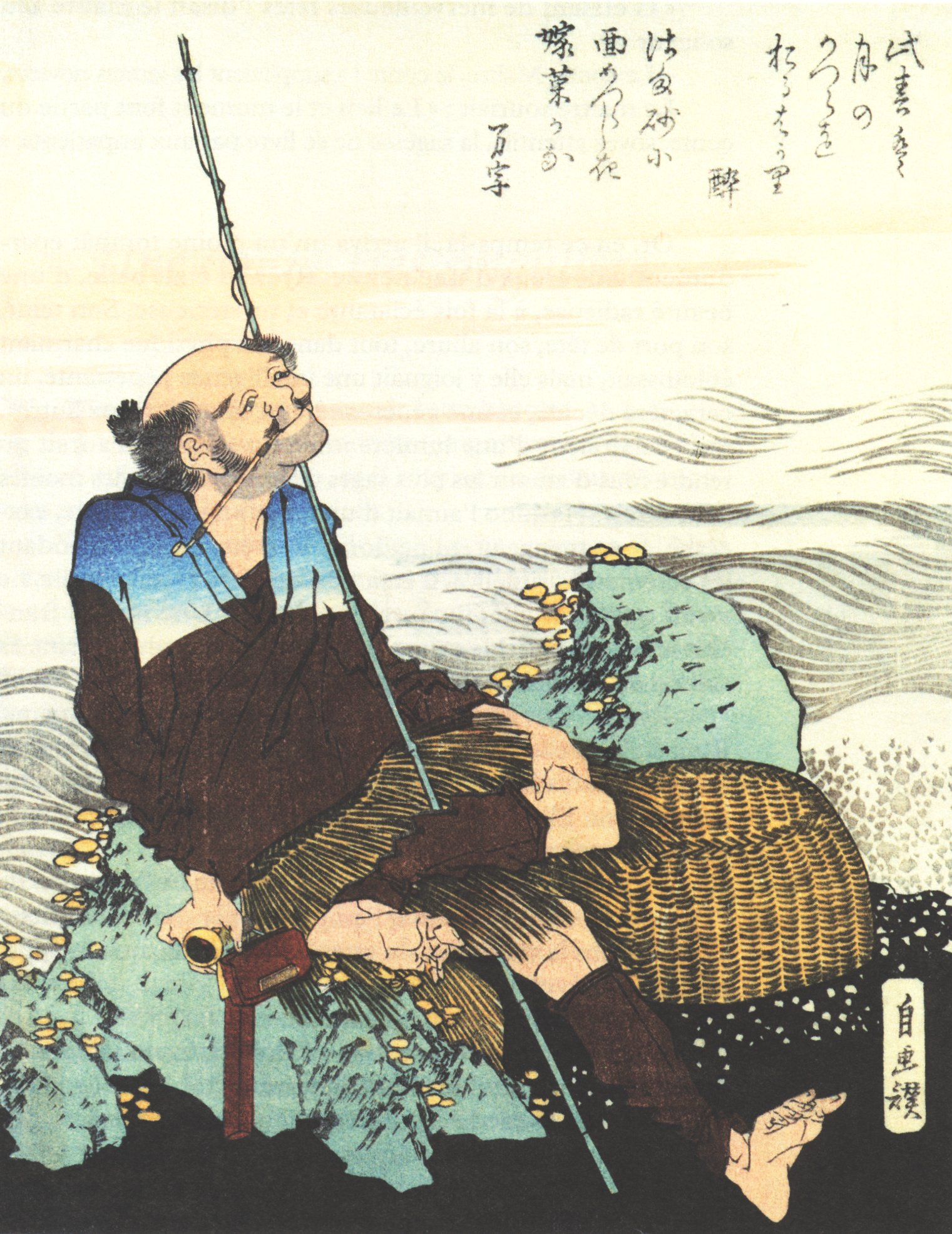
A surimono print by Katsushika Hokusai

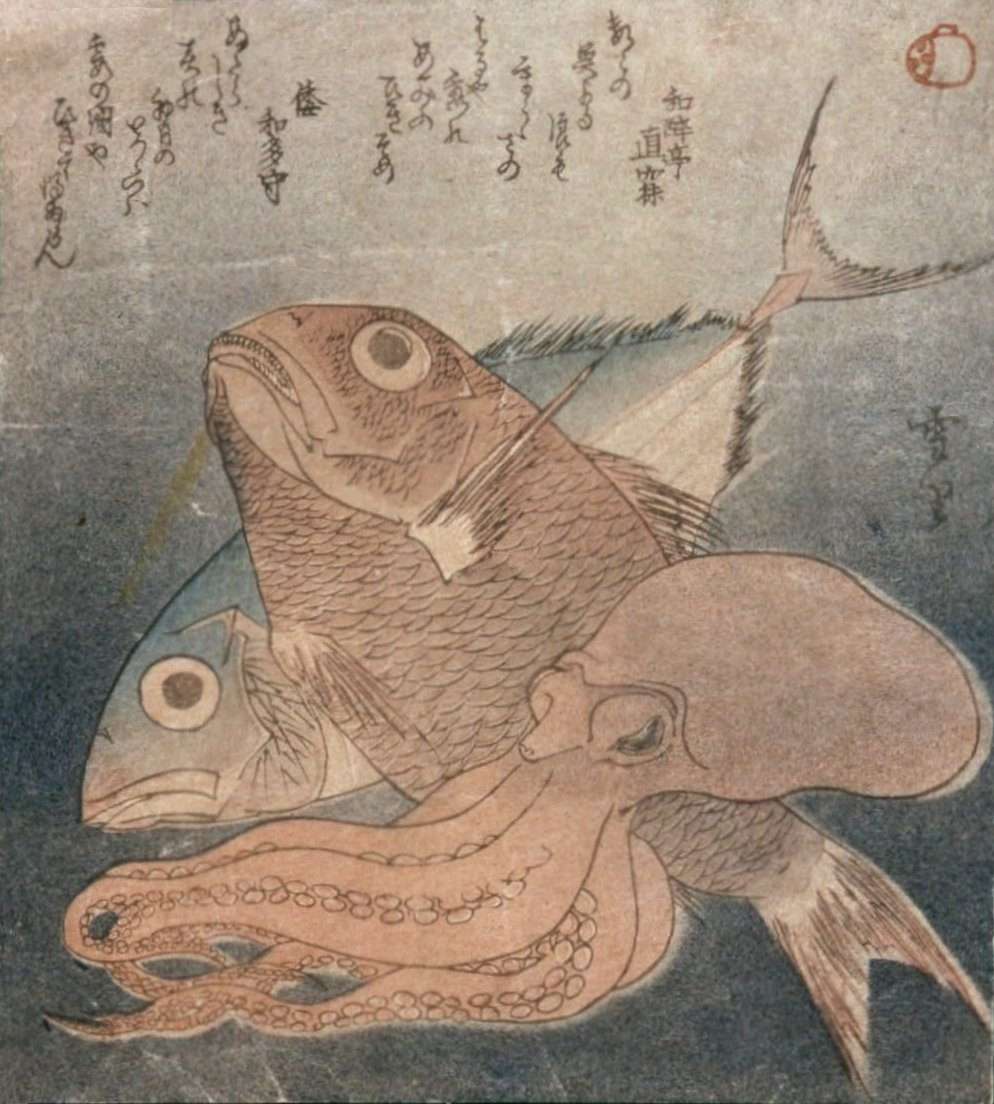
Squid, Bream and Bonito. Surimono by Setsuri (nothing is known about Setsuri (雪里) other than that he designed this surimono for the Drum Group (whose seal is in the right upper corner) about 1820).

Surimono (摺物) are a genre of Japanese woodblock print. They were privately commissioned for special occasions such as the New Year. Surimono literally means "printed thing". Being produced in small numbers for a mostly educated audience of literati, surimono were often more experimental in subject matter and treatment, and extravagant in printing technique, than commercial prints. This extravagance often took the form of karazuri (blind embossing) and the imitation of gold and silver dust on specially prepared paper, printed together with short poems by contemporary literati; the artist Kubo Shunman, for instance, abandoned commercial print production in 1790 to concentrate almost exclusively on this genre. They were most popular from the 1790s to the 1830s, and many leading artists produced them. One of the most famous woodblock artists who got his start from producing surimono was Suzuki Harunobu, credited with being the genius behind the later introduction (in the 1760s) of Nishiki-e ("brocade prints").

== Use ==
In most cases, surimono were commissioned by poetry societies to illustrate the winning poem in a poetry contest judged by the master of the society. Such prints generally had a small format, often c. 205 × 185 mm, and the relief carving of the Kanji characters took a great deal of technical skill. Kabuki actors also commissioned surimono prints to commemorate important events in their careers, such as changes of name and stage debuts of their sons.

== See also ==
- Ukiyo-e
- Woodblock printing
- Woodcut
- Frank Lloyd Wright was a collector of surimono
