= Torii (surname) =

Torii (written : 鳥居) is a Japanese surname. Notable people with the surname include:

- Chiho Torii (born 1970), Japanese former volleyball player
- Keiko Torii, Japanese plant scientist
- Torii Kiyohiro (died c. 1776), Japanese artist
- Torii Kiyomasu (fl. 1690s – 1720s), Japanese painter and printmaker
- Torii Kiyomasu II (c. 1720 - 1750), Japanese painter and woodblock printmaker
- Torii Kiyomitsu (1735 – 1785), Japanese painter and printmaker
- Torii Kiyomoto (1645 - 1702), Japanese actor
- Torii Kiyonaga (1752 – 1815), Japanese artist
- Torii Kiyonobu I (c. 1664 – 1729), Japanese painter and printmaker
- Torii Kiyonobu II (active 1725 - 1760), Japanese ukiyo-e artist
- Torii Kiyotsune (fl. mid-18th century), Japanese artist
- Torii Kotondo (1900 – 1976), Japanese artist
- Mitsuko Torii (born 1943), female Japanese high jump athlete
- Torii Mototada (1539 – 1600), Japanese samurai, who served Tokugawa Ieyasu
- Torii Naritsugu (1570 - 1631), Japanese lord and son of Torii Mototada
- Torii Ryūzō (1870 – 1953), Japanese anthropologist, ethnologist, archaeologist and folklorist
- Torii Suneemon (1540 – 1575), Japanese samurai and ashigaru
- Torii Tadafumi (1847 – 1914), Japanese samurai and daimyō
- Torii Tadaharu (1624 – 1663), Japanese daimyō
- Torii Tadamasa (1567 – 1628), Japanese daimyō
- Torii Tadanori (1646 – 1689), Japanese daimyō
- Torii Tadateru (1665 – 1716), Japanese daimyō
- Torii Tadatsune (1604 – 1636), Japanese daimyō and son of Torii Tadamasa
- Torii Tadayoshi (died 1571), Japanese samurai
- Tokutoshi Torii (born 1947), Japanese architect
- Tomoo Torii (born 1973), Japanese judoka
- Yoshimasa Torii (born 1942), male Japanese pole vault athlete
