= Okumura Toshinobu =

Japanese ukiyo-e artist

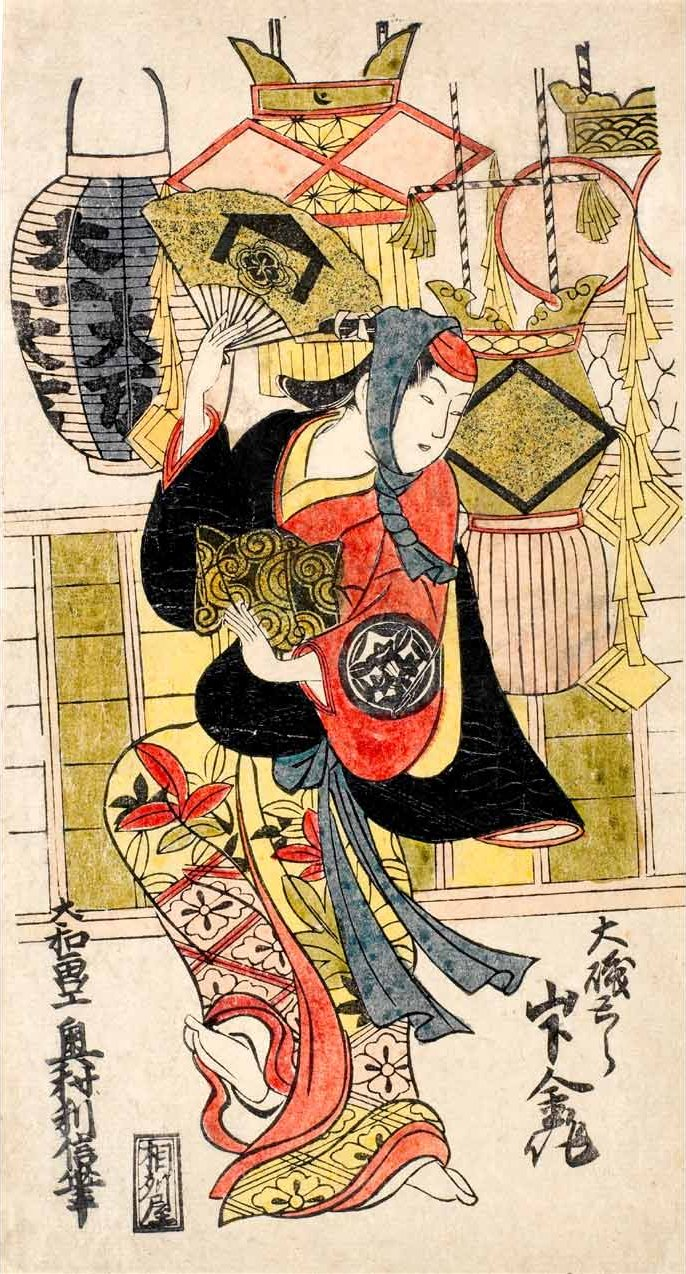
Actor Yamashita Kinsaku I as Tora Gozen, mid-1720s

Okumura Toshinobu (奥村 利信; birth and death dates unknown) was a Japanese ukiyo-e artist. He is the only known student of Okumura Masanobu; many of his works nonetheless appeared from publishers other than Masanobu. Toshinobu, who was active from 1717 to 1750, first under the gō Bunzen and later as Kakugetsudō, was certainly related to his teacher in some family capacity; historians are divided between those who consider him an adopted son of Masanobu and those who see him instead as a younger brother.

The majority of Toshinobu's works come from the Genbun era (1716–1741), and are mostly prints in the beni-e ("red picture[s]") and urushi-e ("lacquer picture[s]") styles. Many of his works depict people selling things. Toshinobu also made yakusha-e portraits of kabuki actors; in contrast to the Torii school, rather than heroics, Toshionobu tended to depict scenes of romance. Compared to Masanobu, Toshinobu's style appears more dynamic, with a soft fullness rendered through detailed draughtsmanship that at times lends his work a particular charm surpassing even that of his master; his small prints are considered one of the minor glories of ukiyo-e, exemplifying how a talented pupil could match his teacher by assiduously practising within a more limited discipline.
