= Torii Kiyotsune =

Japanese ukiyo-e artist

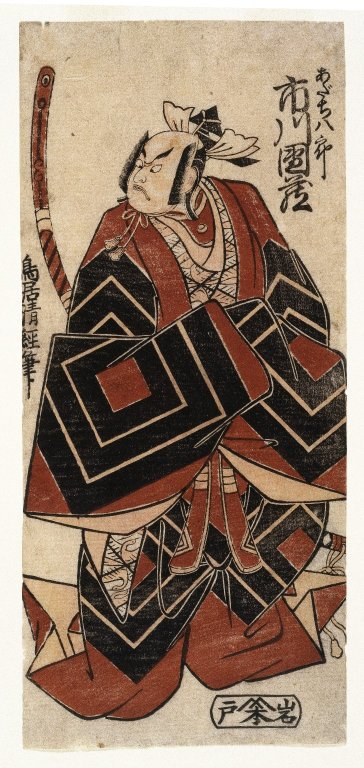
The Actor Ichikawa Danzo in a Shibaraku Role, mid-18th century

Torii Kiyotsune (鳥居 清経, fl. mid-18th century) was a Japanese artist of the Torii school of ukiyo-e art.

Kiyotsune's birth and death dates are unknown; his personal name was Daijirō, and he is believed to have been the son of the publisher Nakajimaya Isaemon (中島屋 伊左衛門). Kiyotsune's work appeared from the end of the Hōreki era (1751–1764) to the end of the An'ei era (1772–1781), a time of great productivity from the Torii school. Kiyotsune produced yakusha-e portraits of kabuki actors with rounded linework in a style established by Kiyonobu II and Kiyomasu II. He also worked extensively in the manner of his teacher Kiyomitsu, from whom he is chiefly distinguished by the expression of weary disdain worn by most of the actors he portrayed, and by the naive, effeminate delicacy of his figures, which often saves his prints from the monotony found in some of Kiyomitsu's work, a delicacy that, in this respect, at times even surpasses that of Harunobu. Although his hand-coloured prints and urushi-e are also known, Kiyotsune is at his best in his beni-e, marked by a piquant line and pattern.

His work is held in the permanent collections of many museums, including the Royal Ontario Museum, the Detroit Institute of Arts, the British Museum, the Harvard Art Museums, the Brooklyn Museum, the Metropolitan Museum of Art, the Los Angeles County Museum of Art, the Indianapolis Museum of Art, the Fine Arts Museums of San Francisco, the Honolulu Museum of Art, and the University of Michigan Museum of Art.
