= Nishimura Shigenaga =

Japanese Artist

Nishimura Shigenaga (Japanese: 西村 重長; c. 1697 – 23 July 1756) was a Japanese ukiyo-e artist.

Shigenaga was born c. 1697 in Edo (modern Tokyo). He worked as a landlord in Tōriabura-chō before moving to the Kanda district, where he ran a bookshop and taught himself art; he is not known to have had a teacher. His work began to appear c. 1719. He worked in a variety of genres and formats. His earlier work tended to be yakusha-e portraits of kabuki actors in the style of the Torii school; his later work is in an idiom more his own, incorporating the influence of Okumura Masanobu and Nishikawa Sukenobu. Other genres he worked in include landscapes, kachō-e pictures of scenes of nature, and historical scenes. He made a number of uki-e "floating pictures" incorporating geometric perspective. The number of uki-e he produced was second only to Masanobu, who asserted himself the originator of the technique.

Shigenaga's better-known work includes the series Fifty-four Sheets of Genji, a collaborative series with Torii Kiyomasu II in c. 1730–35; and the Picture Book of Edo Souvenirs in 1753. He produced some of the earliest ukiyo-e landscape prints; in 1727, his was the first set of prints of Lake Biwa. Of all his innovations, the most significant may be considered his landscape paintings with figures, marking the beginning of landscape as a separate genre within ukiyo-e; Shigenaga lived a century before Hiroshige, but the latter felt his influence as a pioneer of landscape in ukiyo-e. Some historians place his death in 1758 rather than 1756. His work had a strong influence on later artists such as Suzuki Harunobu and Ishikawa Toyonobu, who may have been students of Shigenaga's; Toyonobu may have been Nishimura Shigenobu, Shigenaga's most prominent student. Other pupils included Yamamoto Fujinobu (active 1751–1772), who produced bijinga in Harunobu's style as well as yakusha-e; Tomikawa Fusanobu, also known as Tomikawa Ginsetsu and Yamamoto Kyūzaemon, whose work shows the clear influence of the Torii style; and Yamamoto Yoshinobu, also known by the gō Shigeharu, active from around 1745.

Prints by Shigenaga

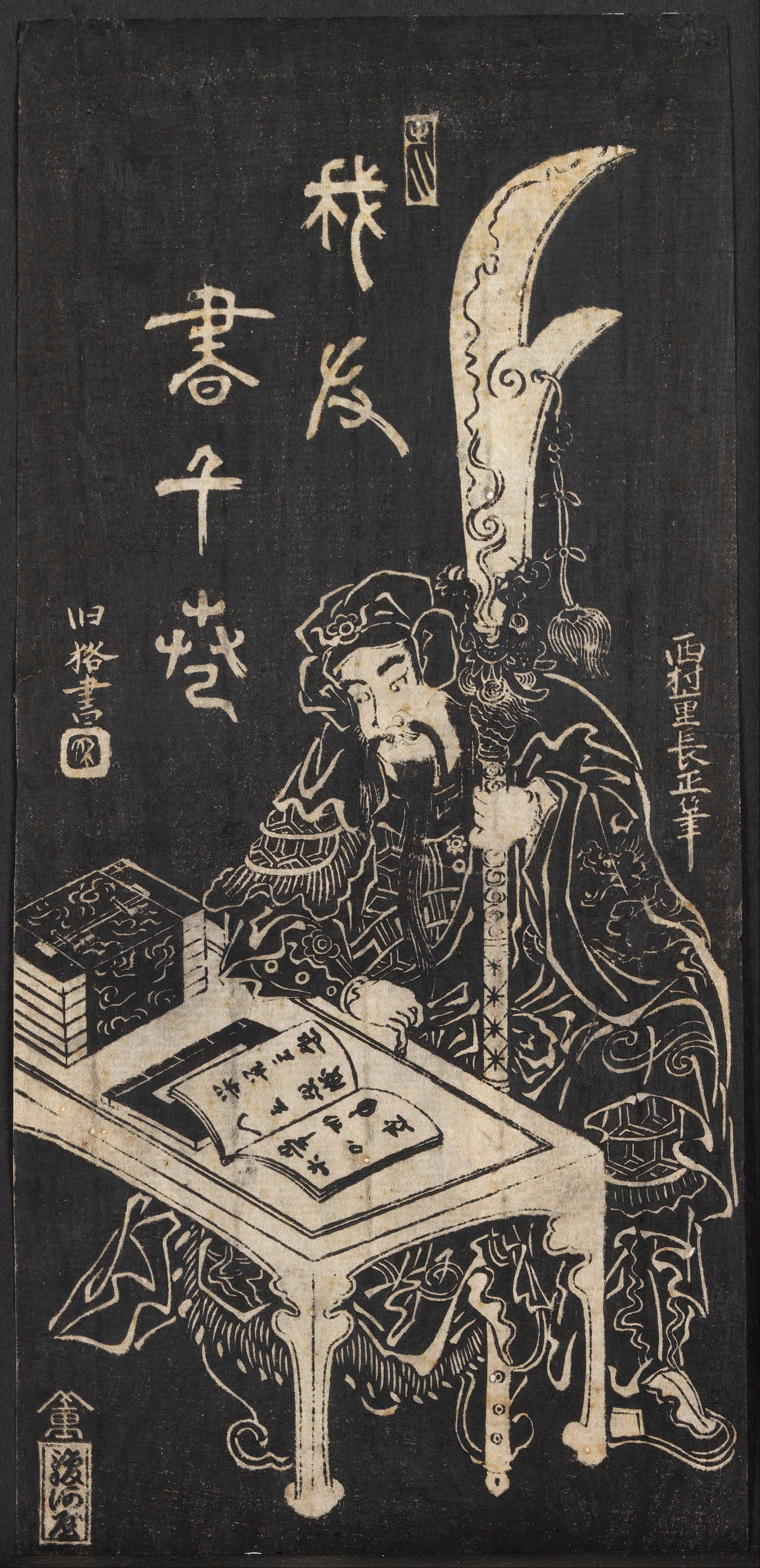

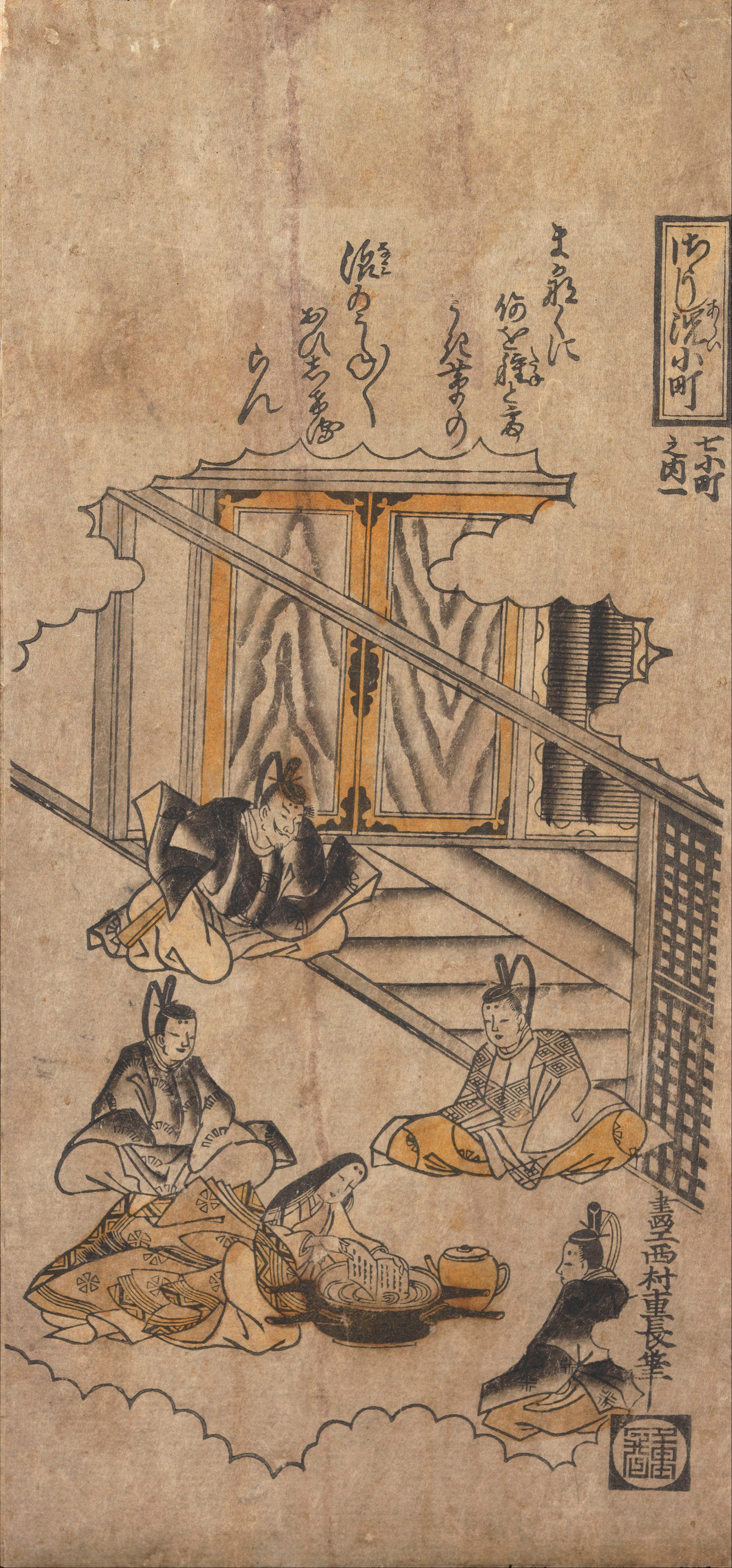

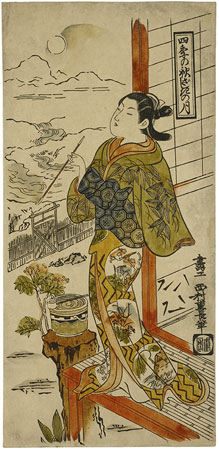

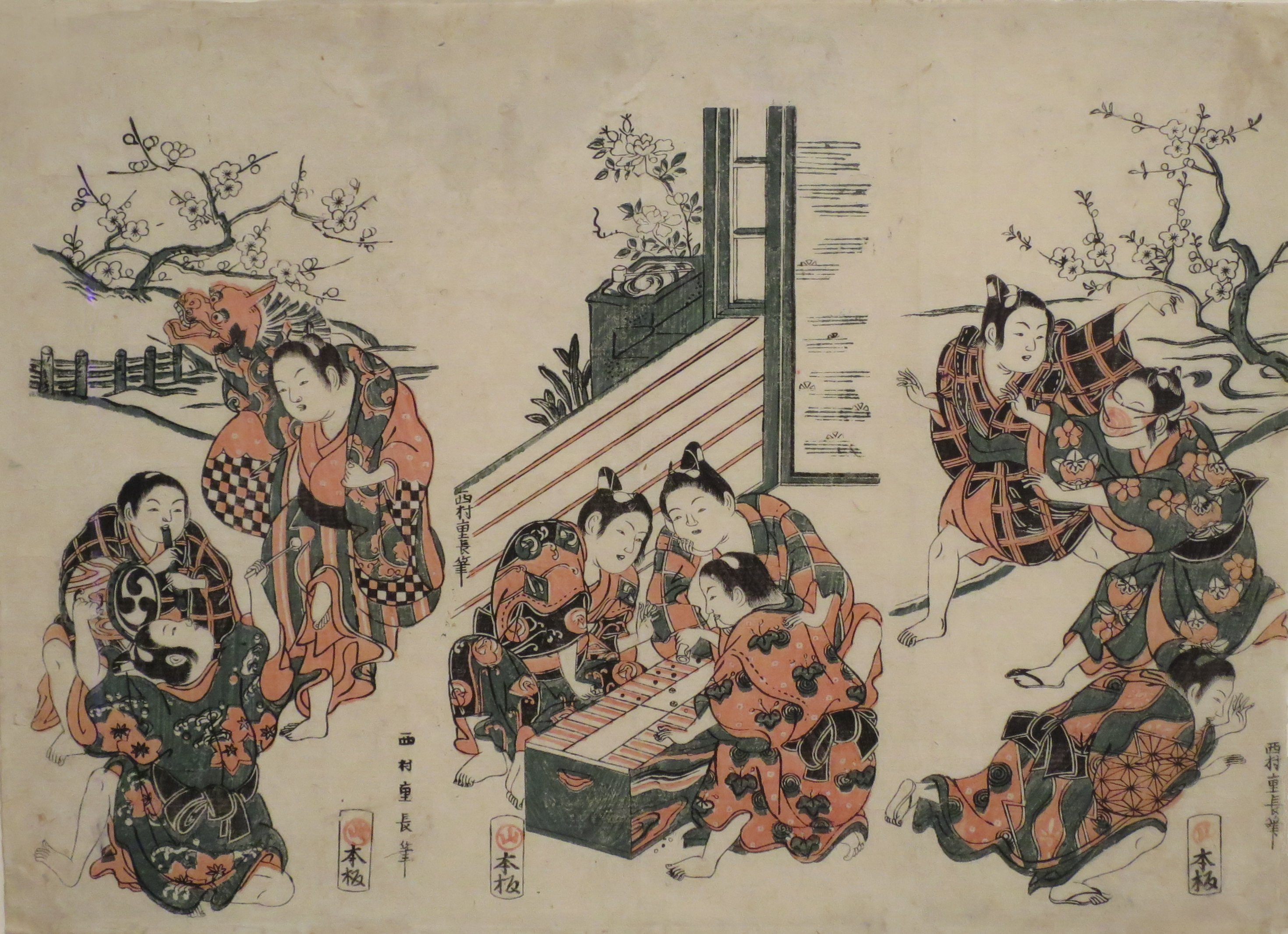

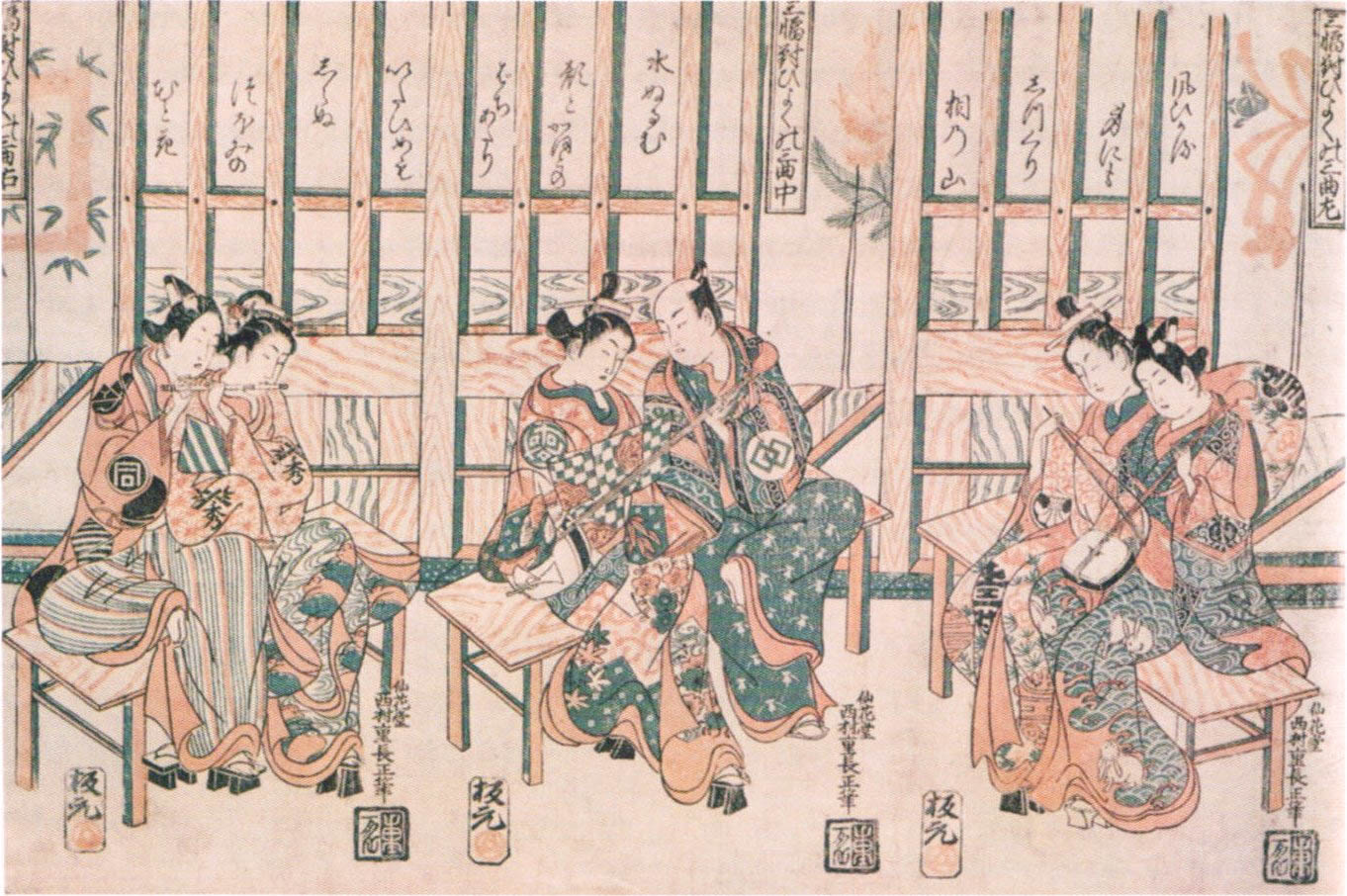
