= Torii Kiyohiro =

Japanese painter

Torii Kiyohiro (鳥居 清広, d. c. 1776) was a Japanese artist of the Torii school of ukiyo-e.

Kiyohiro's date of birth is unknown, while Ukiyo-e Ruikō lists his death date as 1776. No other evidence of those dates is known.

Kiyohiro's personal name was Shichinosuke (七之助). He lived in the Sakaimachi area of Edo (modern Tokyo) and was registered as a student of Torii Kiyomasu I and likely studied under Torii Kiyonobu II or Torii Kiyomasu II. Ernest Fenollosa considered him "of almost equal ability with" his contemporary Torii Kiyomitsu, and speculated they may have been brothers.

Kiyohiro's first known work appeared about 1751, and the last about 1764. All of his known works are benizuri-e, and though the Torii school was known for its yakusha-e actor prints, Kiyohiro also specialized in bijin-ga prints of female beauties extending into some with erotic themes. Although his style closely follows that of Ishikawa Toyonobu, Kiyohiro's prints are highly regarded for their youthful vigour and power. The nudes produced by Kiyohiro and his contemporary Kiyomitsu are exceptional within the whole of Japanese art; both artists experimented briefly with the nude, though not so much to establish a lasting trend in pre-modern Japanese art as to use it as a means of subtle erotic suggestion rather than any glorification of the human form.He specialized in designing prints in the ōban size. Two of his major sponsors/printers were Sakai-ya of Hongoku-chō, and Hōsendō of Tōri Abura-chō, both in the close neighborhood of Ichimura and Nakamura kabuki theaters.

Works by Torii Kiyohiro

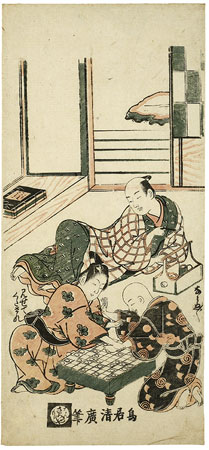
Quarrel over a game of Shogi (Note: Two children playing shogi chess and a grown-up male reading a book. Inscription: “Let me see”, a dialogue on the lower left; artist’s name as Torii Kiyohiro (right-to-left, bottom); printer’s name as #Sakaiya, Honkoku, bottom.), Rijksmuseum

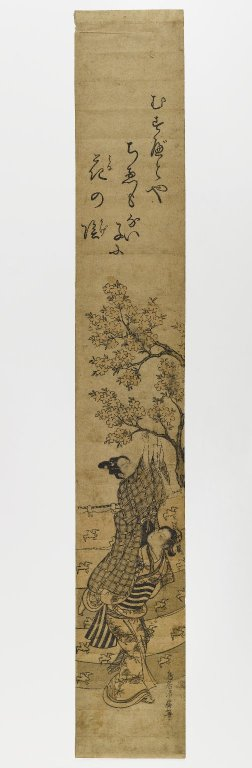
Hashira-e (Note: Inscription: a waka poem, top half of the picture; artist’s name, bottom right.), Brooklyn Museum

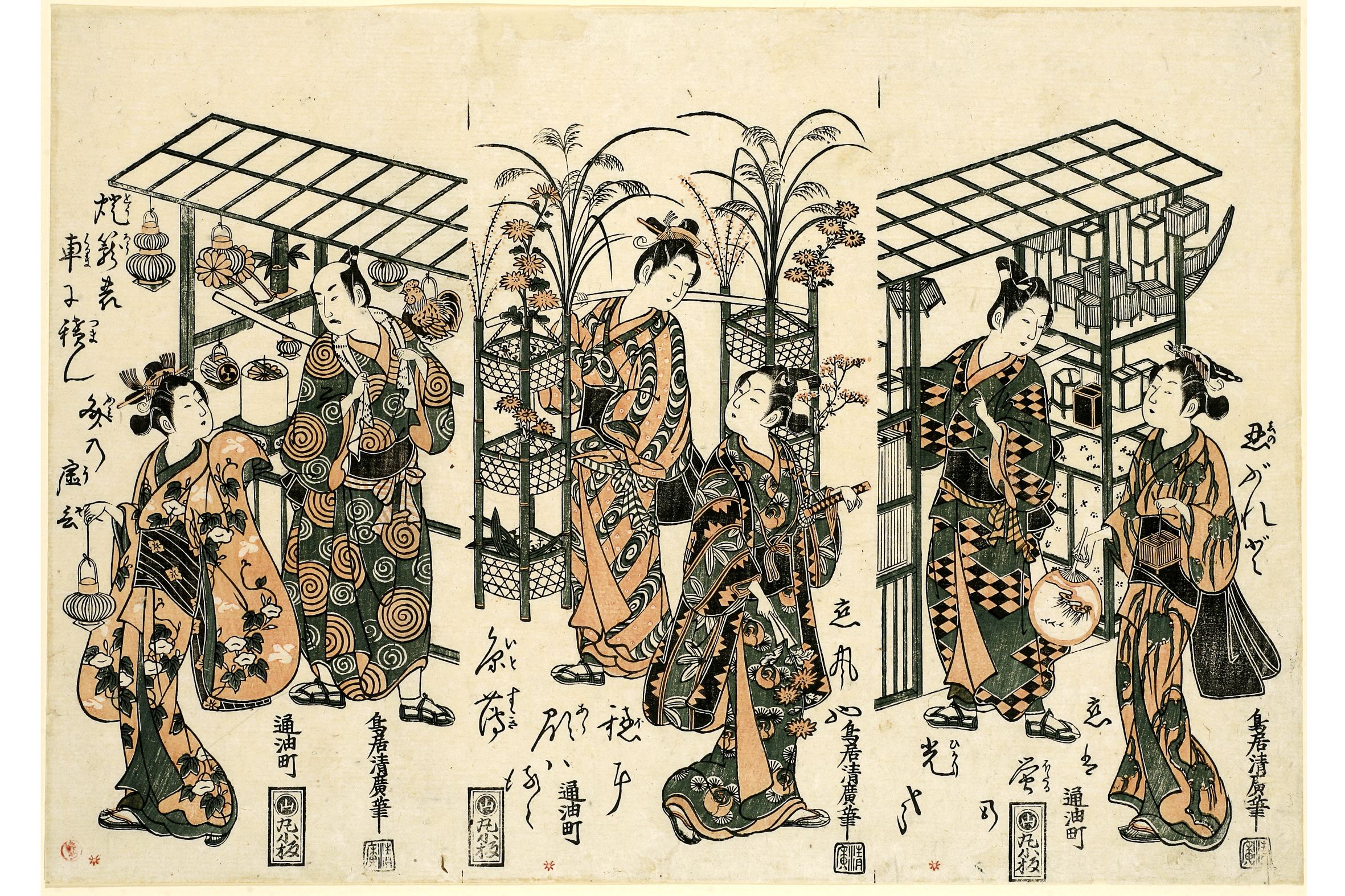
Three Street Vendors (Note: A set of three pictures. Right panel: A young vender selling crickets in basket, and a female customer holding a fan as a symbol for summer; a Haiku poem at the foot of the figures; artist’s name, lower right; printer’s name as Tōri Abura-chō, Yama Maruko-ban aka #Hōsendō, bottom center. Middle panel: A female vender with flowers of early fall, and a customer dressed as a samurai with a katana sword; a Haiku poem, lower left; artist’s name, bottom right; printer’s name, bottom left. Left panel: A male vender selling lanterns, and the female customer in kimono with morning glory design indicating it is summer/early fall; a Haiku poem to the left; artist’s name, bottom right; printer’s name, bottom center.)

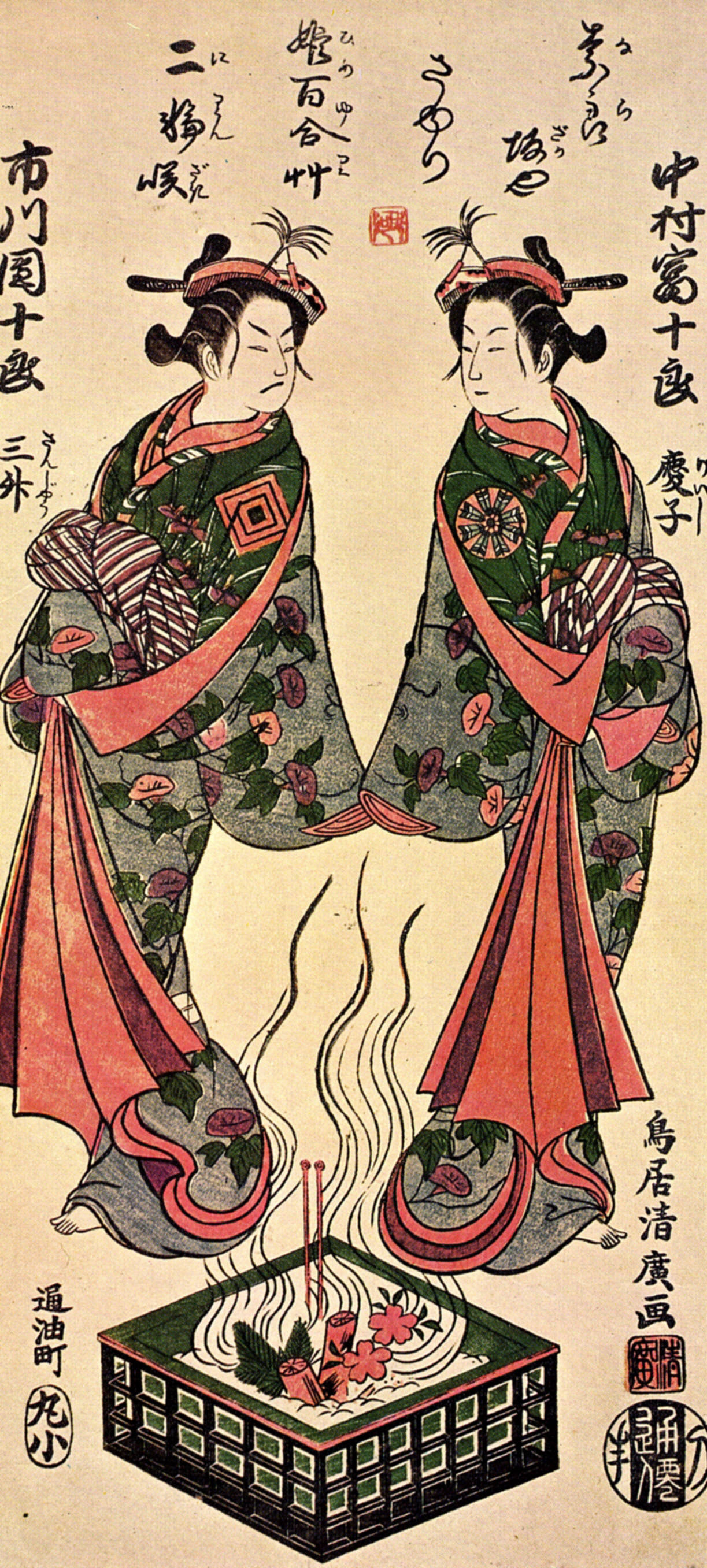
Ichikawa Danjuro IV (l) and Nakamura Tomijuro I (r) (Note: Two kabuki actors in front of a portable furnace. There are cherry blossoms and a twig of pine in the furnace. Inscription: Nakamura Tomijuro as Keishi, a kabuki role (left); a haiku poem (top middle); Ichikawa Danjuro as Sanjo, a kabuki role (right); artist’s name with two seals, bottom right; printer’s name, bottom left.)

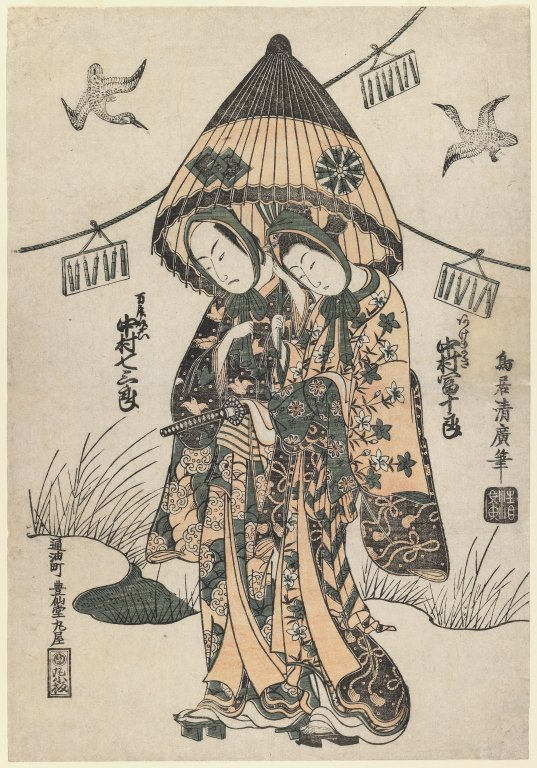
Flower-like Lovers under a partially-closed Umbrella, (Note: Inscriptions: Agemaki courtesan, Nakamura Tomijuro (middle right); a role name, Nakamura Shichisaburo (middle left); artist’s name with a seal (middle far right); printer’s name as Tōri Abura-chō, #Hōsendō Maruya, yama Maruko-ban.) Brooklyn Museum

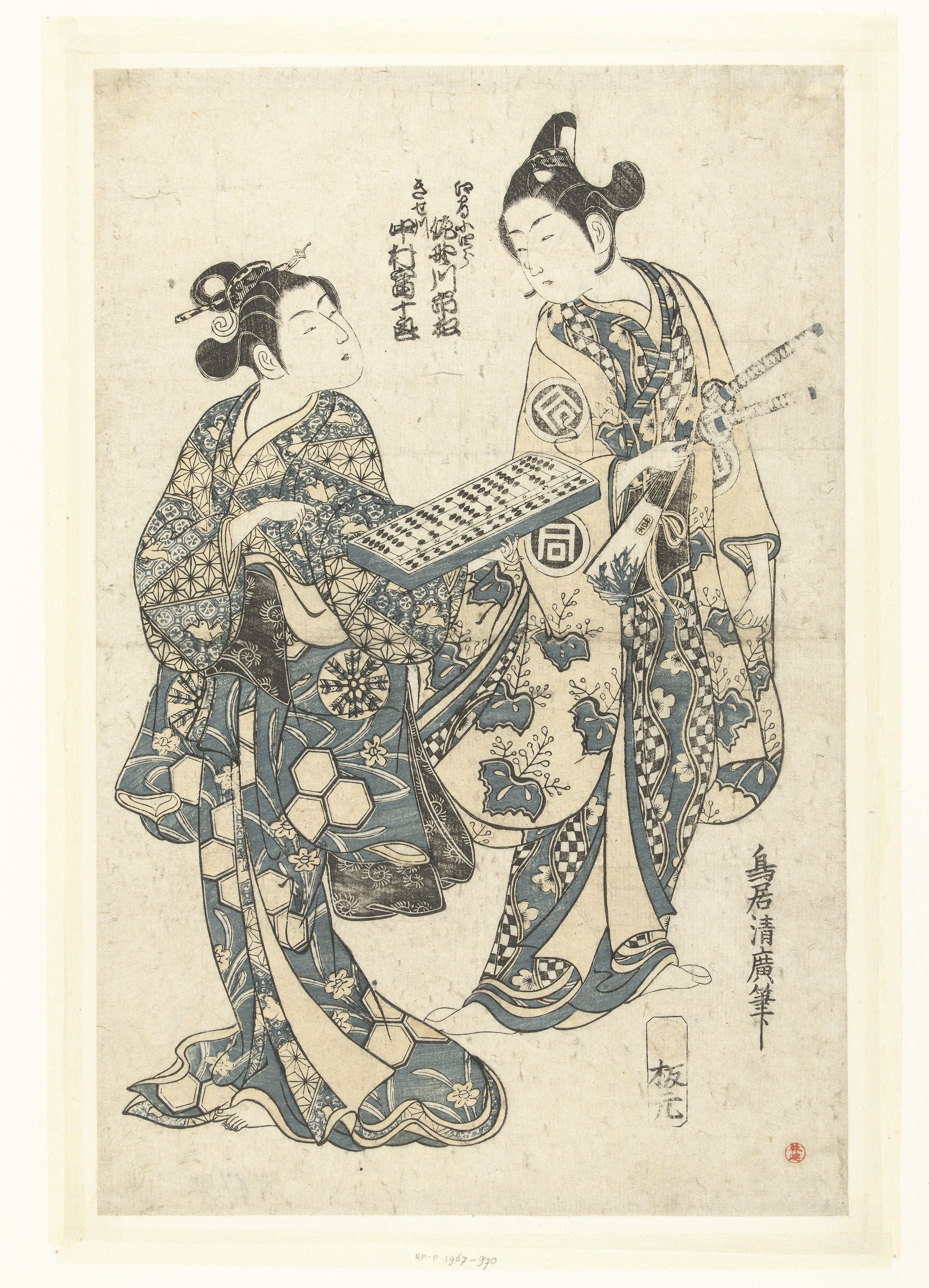
Sanogawa Ichimatsu (r) and Nakamura Tomijuro with an abacus (l). Rijksmuseum (Note: Inscription: Ema Koshiro, the role name, Sanogawa Ichimatsu, a kabuki actor (top middle, right); Kisegawa, the role name, Nakamura Tomijuro, a kabuki actor (top middle, left); artist’s name, bottom right; printer’s name, Hammoto with red seal. Rijksmuseum.)

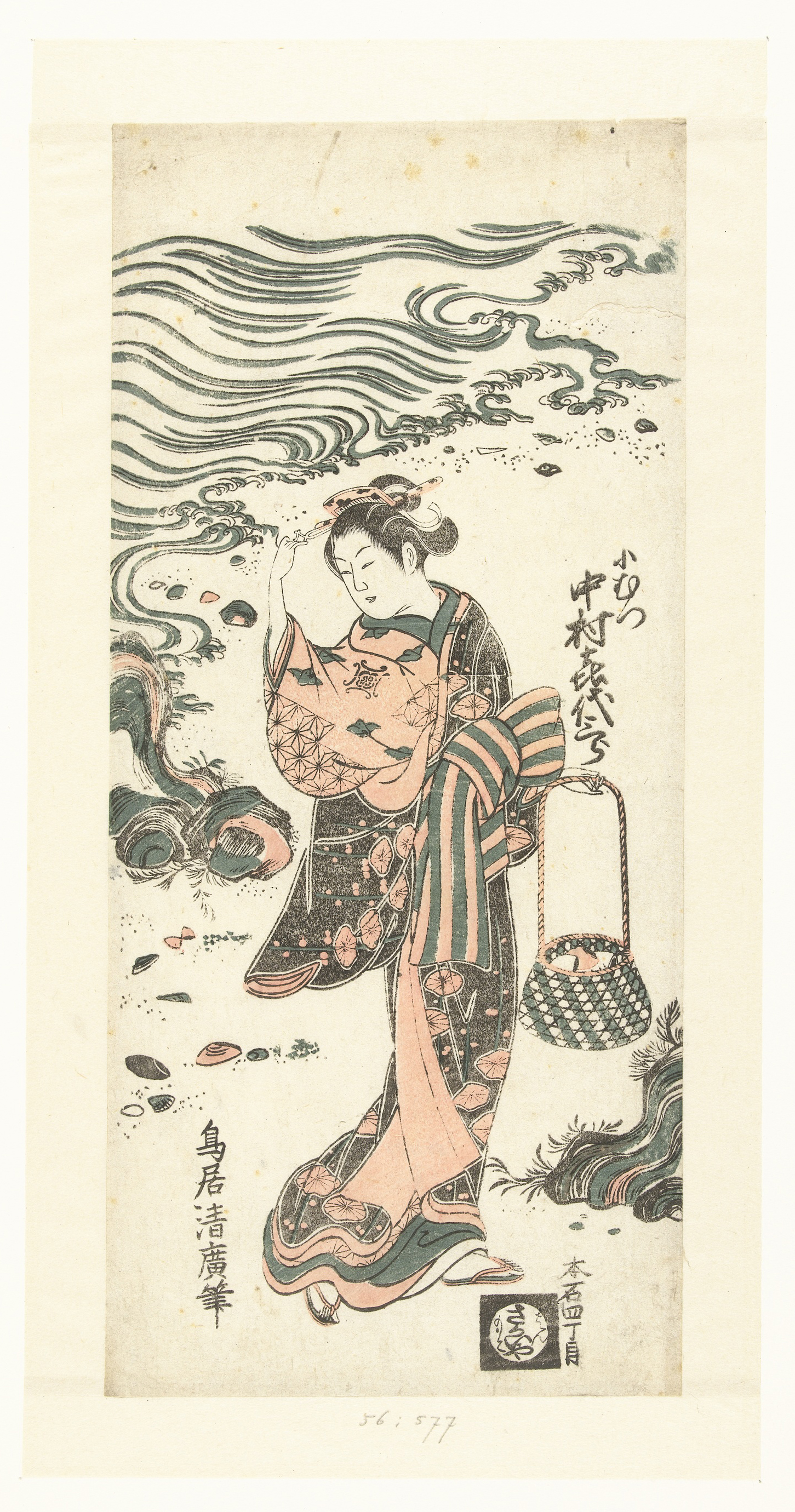
Nakamura Kiyosaburo as Omutsu collecting sea shells. (Note: Inscription: Omutsu, role name; Nakamura Kiyoshiro, kabuki actor (middle right); artist’s name (bottom left); printer’s name, Hongoku yon-chome, #Sakai-ya, Hongoku (bottom right). Rijksmuseum.)

== Footnotes ==
=== Works cited ===
- Fenollosa, Ernest (1896). The Masters of Ukioye: A Complete Historical Description of Japanese Paintings and Color Prints of the Genre School. Knickerbocker Press. hdl:2027/coo1.ark:/13960/t8kd2g97c. LCCN 09026833. OL 7012364M.
- Fujikake, Shizuya (1946). "Torii Kiyohiro". Zōtei Ukiyo-e 増訂浮世絵 (in Japanese) (Zōho (expanded and revised) ed.). Yuzankaku. pp. 101–102. doi:10.11501/1068936. JPNO 46022851.
- Fujisawa, Yukari (2006). "Kawamata Tsuneyuki". In Kobayashi, Tadashi (ed.). Ukiyo eshi retsuden 浮世絵師列伝. Bessatsu Taiyō (in Japanese). Heibonsha. p. 31. ISBN 4-582-94493-0. JPNO 20960182.
- Japan Ukiyo-e Association (1982). Genshoku Ukiyo-e Dai-Hyakka Jiten 原色浮世絵大百科事典 [Original Colour Grand Ukiyo-e Encyclopaedia] (in Japanese). Vol. 6. Taishūkan Publishing. JPNO 82016233.
- Milone, Marco (2022). Ukiyo-e. L'Erudita. ISBN 978-88-6770-727-0.
