= Torii Kiyomitsu =

Japanese painter and printmaker (1735–1785)

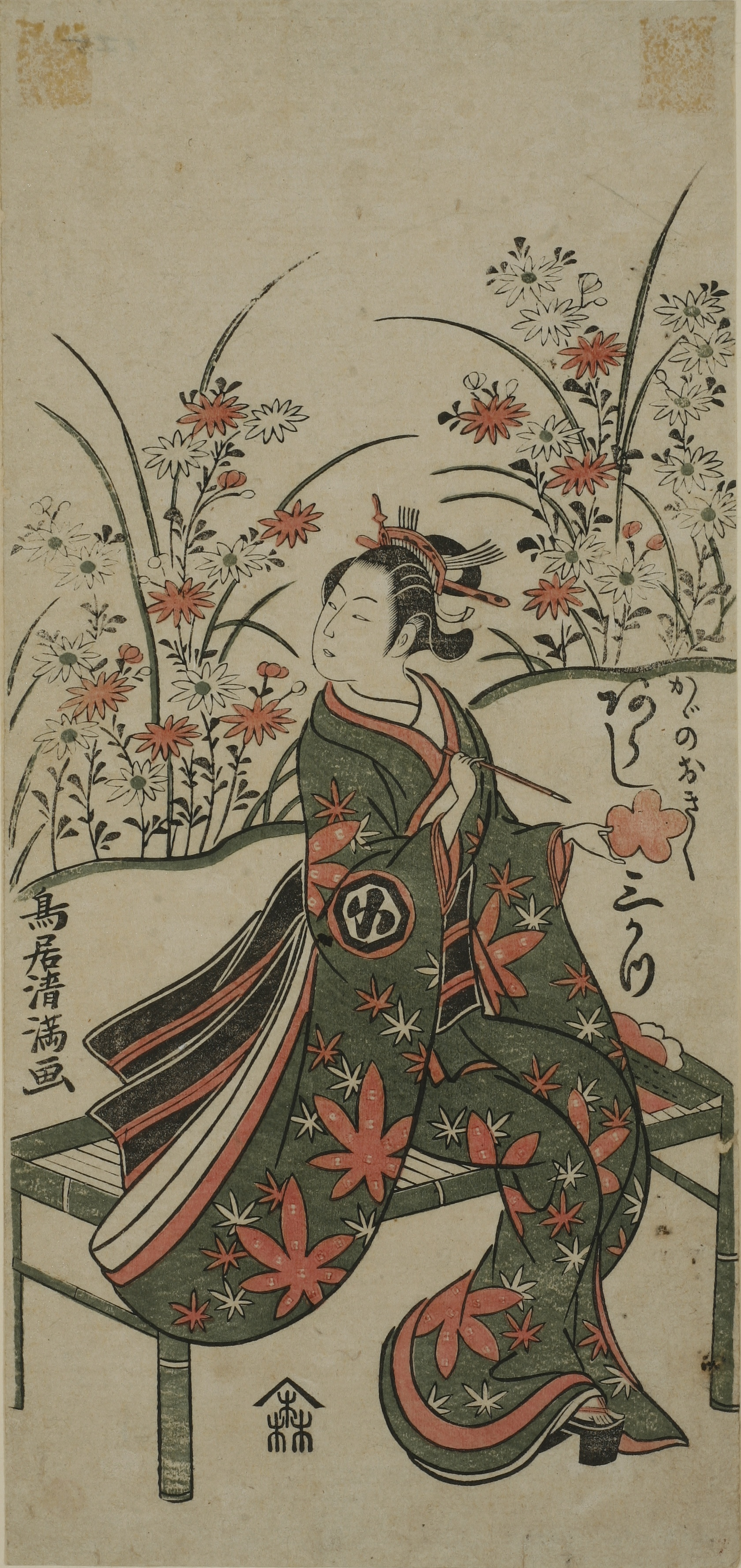
Woddblock print by Torii-Kiyomitsu I, the actor Arashi Sankatsu I. as Kaga no Okiku, 1763

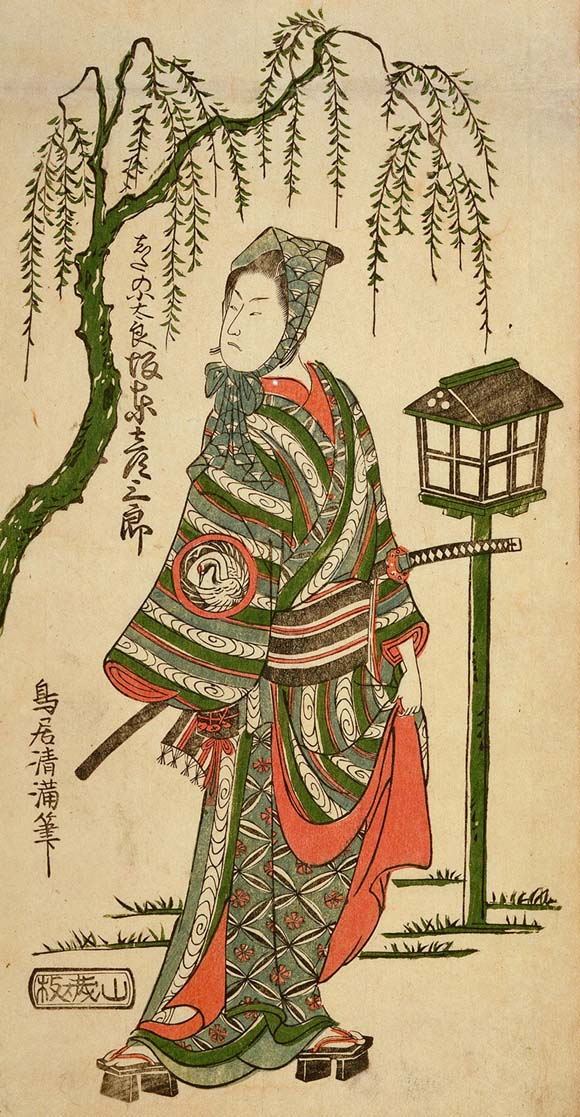
Woodblock print by Torii Kiyomitsu showing kabuki actor Bandō Hikosaburō II as Shita no Kotaro in Katakiuchi Mogami no Inabune

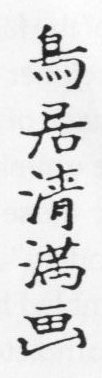
Signature of Torii Kiyomitsu reading “Torii Kiyomitsu ga” (鳥居 清満 画)

Torii Kiyomitsu (鳥居 清満; 1735 – May 11, 1785) was a painter and printmaker of the Torii school of Japanese ukiyo-e art; the son of Torii Kiyonobu II or Torii Kiyomasu II, he was the third head of the school, and was originally called Kamejirō before taking the gō Kiyomitsu. Dividing his work between actor prints and bijinga (pictures of beautiful women), he primarily used the benizuri-e technique prolific at the time, which involved using one or two colors of ink on the woodblocks rather than hand-coloring; full-color prints would be introduced later in Kiyomitsu's career, in 1765.

It is said that, in his early career, Kiyomitsu collaborated with Suzuki Harunobu around the time the latter successfully launched his full-colour nishiki-e ("brocade prints"). He was also a contemporary of the artist Torii Kiyohiro (d. 1776), whose personal name was Shichinosuke and who lived in the Sakaimachi area of Edo.

Though scholars generally note his kabuki prints as lacking originality, they see a grace, beauty, and "dream-like quality" in his prints of young men and women which, at times, rivals that of the work of Suzuki Harunobu, who was just beginning his career at this time. Kiyomitsu continued to produce the billboards and other kabuki-related materials which were the domain of the Torii school, and in those works he was quite traditional and retrospective in his style. However, he was more or less the first Torii artist to experiment outside that field, and to truly emerge into the wider mainstream of ukiyo-e styles, adapting to the use of new techniques and popular subjects. Overall, it is said that the workshop flourished under his direction, but the core "Torii style" was not truly changed or advanced.

Two of his greatest pupils were Torii Kiyotsune, who faithfully continued the Torii traditions, and Torii Kiyonaga, who went on to be a master and innovator in his own right.

== Further readings ==
- Frédéric, Louis (2002). "Japan Encyclopedia". Cambridge, Massachusetts: Harvard University Press.
- Hickman, Money (1993). "Enduring Alliance: The Torii Line of Ukiyo-e Artists and Their Work for the Kabuki Theatre". Fenway Court, 1992. Boston: Isabella Stewart Gardner Museum.
- Lane, Richard. (1978). Images from the Floating World, The Japanese Print. Oxford: Oxford University Press. ISBN 9780192114471; OCLC 5246796
