= Okumura =

Okumura (written: 奥村) is a Japanese surname. Notable people with the surname include:

- Chiyo Okumura (born 1947), popular Japanese Pop singer and former fashion model
- Haruhiko Okumura, Japanese engineer
- Okumura Ioko (1845–1907), Japanese activist
- Okumura Hatsune (born 1990), Japanese singer-songwriter
- Okumura Masanobu (1686–1764), Japanese print designer, book publisher, and painter
- Miyuki Okumura (奥村 心雪), Japanese graphic designer
- Rosie Okumura, American voice actor, content creator, and musician
- Shigeo Okumura (born 1972), Japanese professional wrestler currently working in Mexico
- Shohaku Okumura (born 1948), Japanese Soto Zen priest, founder of the Sanshin Zen Community in Bloomington, Indiana
- Takeshi Okumura (born 1952), Japanese professional pool player
- Tenzo Okumura (born 1944), Japanese politician of the Democratic Party of Japan, a member of the House of Representatives in the Diet
- Togyu Okumura (1889–1990), famous Japanese modern painter of the nihonga style of watercolour painting
- Okumura Toshinobu (奥村 利信), Japanese ukiyo-e artist
- Tsunao Okumura (1903–1972), the president of Nomura Securities between 1948 and 1959
- Yoshihiro Okumura (swimmer) (born 1983), international swimmer, competing in the freestyle

== Fictional characters ==
- Eiji Okumura, a main character in Banana Fish
- Haru Okumura, a playable main character in Persona 5
  - Kunikazu Okumura, Haru's father and a major antagonist
- Koushuu Okumura, a character in Ace of Diamond
- Masamune Okumura, the main character of 2.5 Dimensional Seduction
- Rin and Yukio Okumura, the main characters of Blue Exorcist
- Tomichi and Yumiko Okumura, characters in The Walking Dead

== See also ==
- Okumura Model, a Radio propagation model built using the data collected in the city of Tokyo, Japan
