= Kiyomitsu =

- Gender: Male

Origin
- Origin: Japanese
- Meaning: Different meanings depending on the kanji used

Kiyomitsu (written: 清光, 清允 or 清満) is a masculine Japanese given name. Notable people with the name include:

- Kiyomitsu Kobari (小針 清允; born 1977), Japanese footballer
- Kiyomitsu Mizuuchi (水内 清光; born 1960), Japanese voice actor
- Torii Kiyomitsu (鳥居 清満; 1735–1785), Japanese painter and printmaker
