= Hanbei =

Hanbei may refer to:

- Yoshida Hanbei, Japanese illustrator in the ukiyo-e style
- Takenaka Shigeharu, Japanese samurai also known as Hanbei
