= Torii Kiyomoto =

Torii Kiyomoto (Japanese: 鳥居 清元; 1645–1702) was a kabuki actor from Osaka and painter of billboards and other kabuki advertisements; the founder of the Torii school of artists, he painted in an early form of what came to be known as the ukiyo-e style. Onstage, he went by the name Torii Shōshichi.

== Career ==
=== Acting ===
Moving to Edo in 1687 with his son Shōbei, he made his home very close to the entertainment district. He was unsuccessful onstage, like many other Osaka actors who tried to adapt to the Edo acting styles and audience preferences, so he turned to focus exclusively on painting advertisements and billboards for the kabuki theater. In 1690, Kiyomoto produced the first poster for the Ichimura-za theatre, originating a professional kabuki poster style that his son would go on to refine, and which remained popular for several decades.

=== Painting ===
Soon eclipsed by Shōbei, who took the name Torii Kiyonobu in his artistic career, the pair established a school of painting which strongly influenced that of the emerging ukiyo-e, and which monopolized the painting of kabuki signboards through the Edo period and into the 20th century. Like his father, Kiyonobu was himself a kabuki actor who specialised in onnagata roles.

None of his work is known to survive today.

== Further readings ==
- Hickman, Money (1993). Enduring Alliance: The Torii Line of Ukiyo-e Artists and Their Work for the Kabuki Theatre. Fenway Court, 1992. Boston: Isabella Stewart Gardner Museum.
- Lane, Richard. (1978). Images from the Floating World, The Japanese Print. Oxford: Oxford University Press. ISBN 9780192114471; OCLC 5246796
