= Urushi-e =

Techniques in Japanese art

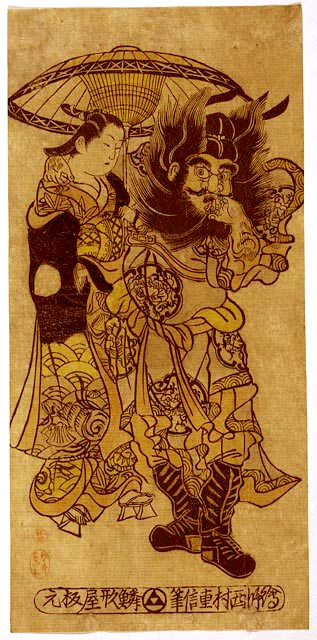
Nishimura Shigenobu, Shōki and Girl, c. 1720s. Woodblock print with hand-coloring and lacquer (urushi). Hosoban. 13 in. x 5 5/8 in.

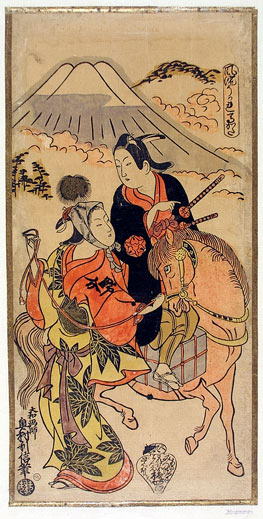
Okumura Toshinobu (active 1717–1750), 'Young Lovers by Mount Fuji', About 1720, urushi-e (lacquer print) V&A Museum no. E.1419-1898

Urushi-e (漆絵 "lacquer picture[s]") refers to three different techniques in Japanese art. Though urushi-e is most associated with woodblock, the term urushi-e is not exclusive to that medium. It can also refer to pictures using lacquer as a paint on three-dimensional lacquered objects; and paintings using actual lacquer on paper or occasionally silk.

== Technique ==
In Japanese woodblock printing, urushi-e generally refers to a hand-painted technique. Instead of printing with urushi (natural lacquer) it was painted on by hand. This meant that urushi-e pictures could be more colorful than most block prints of the time. Five colors were available when the technique was first developed; brown, yellow, green, red, and black. Urushi-e was sometimes used as a term to describe all hand-painted woodblock prints in Japan, not only those painted with lacquer, however, only urushi-e used iro-urushi, meaning colored lacquer, made from mixing clear lacquer and one of the five pigments. Artists such as Nishimura Shigenaga c. 1680s–1750 were also known to use black ink thickened with hide glue to attain a lacquer-like effect on some on his prints. In addition to colored lacquer, gold was sometimes applied to urushi-e works in the form of gold leaf and powders.

== Prints ==
Urushi-e woodblock prints were made using thick, dark black lines, and were sometimes hand-colored. The ink was mixed with an animal-based glue called nikawa, which thickened it and gave it a lustrous shine, said to resemble lacquer. Most often, this was used not in creating the entire print, but only in enhancing a particular element, such as an obi or a figure's hair, to give it shine and make the image more luxurious overall.

The printmaker Okumura Masanobu, often cited as a master of the urushi-e style, is credited with producing his first urushi-e prints in 1718, using brass powder sprinkled onto the ink to create a lacquered effect that added texture and depth to the image while also helping to preserve it; a well-known example depicts a wide perspective view of the interior of the Echigo-ya shop in Suruga-chō.

Prints which include urushi-e elements are likely to also feature the use of mica, metal dusts, and other elements which enhanced the appearance, quality and value of the works. The technique was most popular in the early 18th century Japan during the Edo era and can be seen in works by many artists of the time.

== Paintings ==
In painting, the term refers to the use of colored lacquers, produced by mixing pigments with clear lacquer. The use of colored lacquer for painting goes back to the prehistoric Jōmon period, and became especially popular in the Nara period (8th century), when a great many works were made using red lacquer against a black background. Until the 19th century, however, the use of natural pigments restricted the colors accessible to artists to red, black, yellow, green, and light brown.

== Artists ==
Artist Shibata Zeshin (1807–1891) is known for his innovations in this regard, and is believed by some to be the first to use lacquer not just as a decorative element (in painting boxes, furniture, and pottery) but as a medium for painted scrolls. Zeshin experimented extensively with various substances, which he mixed with lacquer to create a variety of effects, including simulating the appearance of various metals (iron, gold, bronze, copper), and imitating the appearance and texture of Western oil painting.

Other artists who used the technique include:

- Torii Kiyonobu I (1664–1729) a member of the Torii ukiyo-e school used urushi-e.
- Torii Kiyomasu another member of the Torii school also made five pigment urushi-e.
- Another artist Nishimura Shigenaga, used it in brass powder in some of his urushi-e works.
- Okumura Masanobu was another who used this technique in the Edo era.
- Nhat Tran is a present-day urushi-e artist from Vietnam.

== See also ==
- Urushi
