= Yoshida Hanbei =

Japanese illustrator

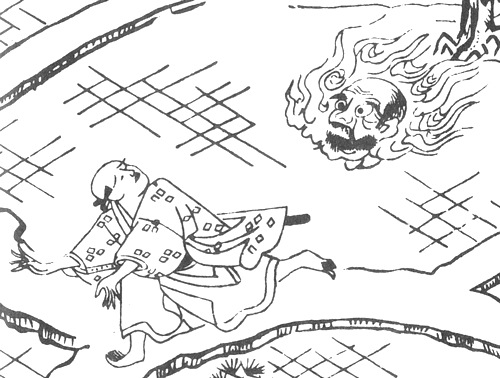
Sōgenbi (宗玄火, the fiery ghost of an oil-stealing monk) from the Shin Otogi Boko (新御伽婢子)

Yoshida Hanbei (吉田 半兵衛) was a late seventeenth-century Japanese illustrator in the ukiyo-e style, the leading illustrator in Kyoto and Osaka around 1664–1689. Unlike many more famous ukiyo-e artists, who worked primarily on individual woodblock prints and paintings, Hanbei worked primarily, if not exclusively, in illustrations for woodblock printed books. Alternatively known as Yoshida Sadakichi, his name is also sometimes romanized as Hambei.

Hanbei was the first ukiyo-e book illustrator of Kamigata to sign his works. One of the most prolific artists in early ukiyo-e, he produced work for at least ninety different books, amounting to over one thousand individual illustrations. His work appeared in a myriad of texts, including books of jōruri puppet plays, Kabuki, novels, travel books, Buddhist subjects, musical texts, and courtesan critiques, among others. He is particularly famous for his illustrations of novels by Saikaku, and for his Joyō Kimmō-zui (女用訓蒙図彙, "Ladies' Pictorial Encyclopedia"), which shows off kimono fashions.

Deriving his style from those of the anonymous Kyoto-area illustrators who preceded him, Hanbei's only teacher to be known by name is Shōgorō; however, nothing signed by the teacher remains extant today. As larger-size art books and albums were yet to become common, Hanbei's monochrome works in the restricted medium of book illustrations did not allow him to show great individuality or creativity, outside of a few works of shunga (erotic images) he produced. Richard Lane writes of Hanbei, that "his illustrations are consistently adroit and well thought out but clearly the work of a talented master rather than of an artistic genius."

It is believed that Hanbei either died or retired in 1690; two disciples of his took over book illustration for the region, but did not sign their works, leaving them anonymous.

Hanbei's book illustrations were also an acknowledged influence on other ukiyo-e artists of the following generation: his work, together with that of Hishikawa Moronobu and his school, has been identified as an influence on Kaigetsudō Ando, and it has also been suggested that Torii Kiyonobu I studied under Hanbei, in addition to Torii Kiyotaka, while also closely studying the works of Hishikawa Moronobu.
