= Okumura Masanobu =

Japanese painter

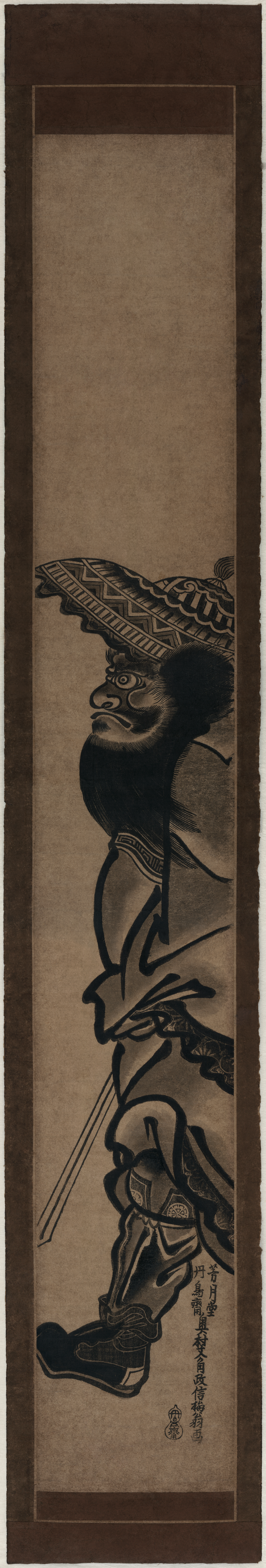
"Shōki zu" (Shōki striding), by Okumura Masanobu in pillar print format, c. 1741–1751

Okumura Masanobu (Japanese: 奥村 政信; 1686 – 13 March 1764) was a Japanese print designer, book publisher, and painter. He also illustrated novelettes and in his early years wrote some fiction. At first his work adhered to the Torii school, but later drifted beyond that. He is a figure in the formative era of ukiyo-e doing early works on actors and bijin-ga ("pictures of beautiful women").

== Life and career ==
While Masanobu's early life is largely undocumented, he is believed to have been born about 1686, possibly in Edo (modern Tokyo). Edo was a small fishing village when Tokugawa Ieyasu chose it as his administrative capital of the Tokugawa shogunate, and by the early 17th century the city had prospered and its population had grown to half a million.

Masanobu appears to have been self-taught painter (though he did study poetry under Tachiba Fukaku); he is not known to have belonged to any artistic school. Over his career he used several gō art names, including Bunkaku, Genroku, Hōgetsudō, Shidōken and Tanchōsai. His early work shows the influence of the Torii school of ukiyo-e painting, particularly Torii Kiyonobu I, and he likely learned from the examples of Torii Kiyomasa and the early ukiyo-e artist Hishikawa Moronobu. A print album published by Kurihara Chōemon in 1701 depicting courtesans in the Yoshiwara pleasure district is Masanobu's earliest surviving signed work, followed by a similar work ten months later. Moronobu provided the illustrations, and sometimes text, for at least twenty-two ukiyo-zōshi novels and librettos for puppet theatre between 1703 and 1711. These included a modernized illustrated version of the 11th-century Tale of Genji in eighteen volumes, whose translation was by Masanobu.

After 1711 Masanobu's output of book illustrations shriveled as he turned his attention to albums of prints, usually about a dozen per set, on a variety of themes—most outstanding of which were the comic albums. These prints, influenced perhaps by 12th-century Toba-e and the caricature paintings of Hanabusa Itchō (1652–1724), depicted humorous scenes from, or parodies of, Noh, kabuki, and Japanese mythology. This period also saw Masanobu produce large kakemono-sized (Note: Kakemono-sized prints measured about 56 × 30 centimetres (22 × 12 in).) portraits of courtesans, whose designs had a warmth and humanity largely absent from the earlier Torii and Kaigetsudō beauties. The financial restraints of the Kyōhō Reforms begun in 1717 brought an end to the luxury of these large prints, replaced by smaller hosoban-sized (Note: Hosoban-sized prints measured about 30 × 15.5 centimetres (11.8 × 6.1 in).) prints, which were often sold as triptychs—which when placed together were little smaller than the kakemono-sized prints. At least as early as 1718, Masanobu's were some of the earliest urushi-e prints, printed with brass powder sprinkled on the ink, which created a lacquer effect.

About 1721 Masanobu abandoned the publishers of his earlier works and opened his own wholesaler, Okumura-ya, in Tōri Shio-chō in Edo. His trade mark was a gourd-shaped sign, a mark he thereafter stamped on the works he printed.

It is likely that Masanobu died at 78 (Note: Or 79 by Japanese reckoning, by which one begins life at age one.) in 1764; 1769 has also been given as his death date.

== Art styles ==
Okumura Masanobu is said to be master of the urushi-e style. Urushi-e is usually done on woodblocks and has thick black lines. Styles of urushi-e can be found in many works from Masanobu. The most famous examples are Large Perspective View of the Interior of Echigo-ya in Suruga-chô, Actor holding folders, Actor as Wakanoura Osana Komachi, Actors Ôtani Hiroji and Sodesaki Iseno, and Lion, Peonies, and Rock. All of these works have dark, thick lines and are made on woodblocks. His works are famous for his gentile and flowing lines throughout his drawings.

He has a recurring pattern consisting of tan backgrounds and neutral coloring. His pieces capture things and or people in motion. His objects in drawings are always in mid-motion of walking somewhere or doing something. Masanobu was famous for capturing the beauty of nature. He painted and drew birds, women, men, actors, and warriors. The Japanese women he draws have the same style and 'boneless' structure. The faces show; however, the bodies are covered by long, flowing dresses. This style is referred to as tan-e: drawing women as full-bodied and round. The tan-e style brings a sense of gentleness and gracefulness to the beauties.

Okumura Masanobu's art consists of the insights of stores and theatres. These pieces are large-scale and referred to as uki-e. Uki-e is a style used by Japanese artists that means "looming picture". He was very good at capturing the luxury and leisure of his paintings on theatre. He played around and experimented with all kinds of styles on woodprints and was always willing to learn more. By experimenting, he created and is said to be the first artist to make pillar prints. Okumura is also said to be the creator of the large, wide, vertical prints referred to as habahiro hashira-e. Many of his scripts are examples of this style of print. Although early commentators credited Masanobu as the first to introduce uki-e into ukiyo-e prints and paintings, the earliest known printed example is now attributed to Torii Kiyotada I, from around 1739–40; Masanobu's own uki-e works followed shortly afterward, and he was particularly skilled at depicting interiors.

Masanobu was known for staying true to his time and what he was good at. He created many new styles that are used today; without him art wouldn't be the same.

Masanobu's ukiyo-e were mostly produced in the Kyōhō era. They display the printmaker's sense of line, colour, and composition. The subjects are most often humorous and are executed in a lively manner with figures in brightly coloured, fashionable clothing.

== Gallery ==
Works by Okumura Masanobu

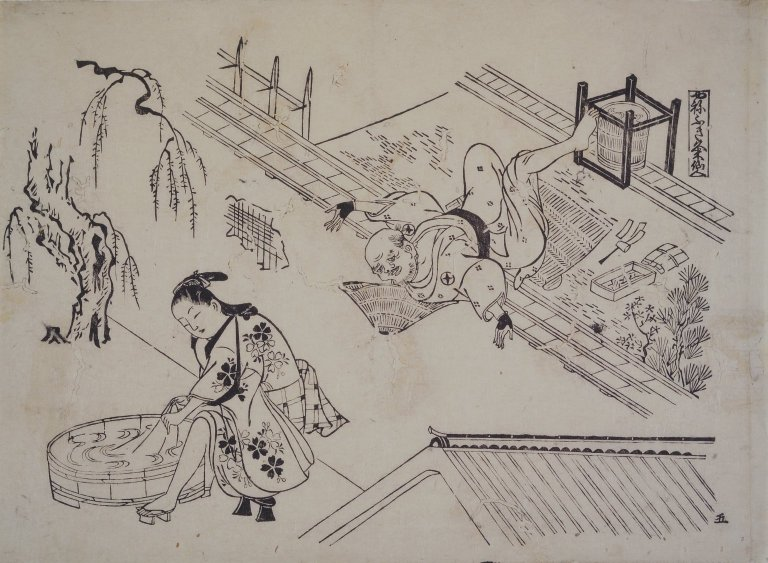
A Roofer's Precariousness

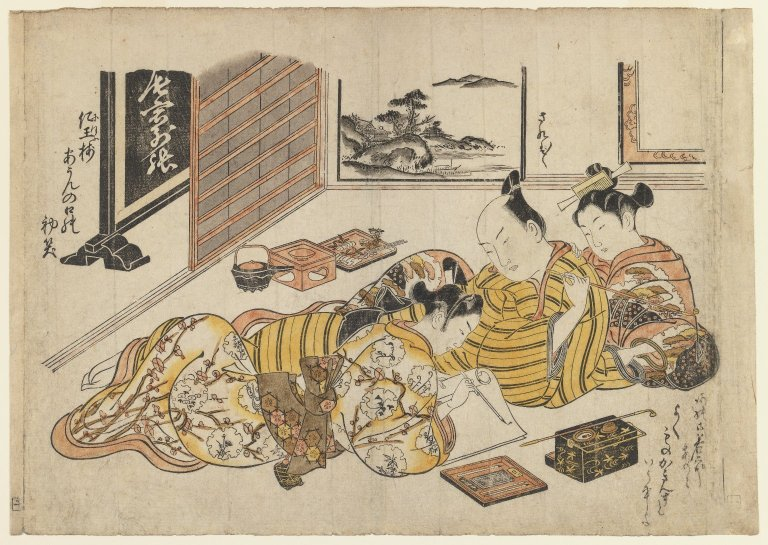
Daytime in the Gay Quarters

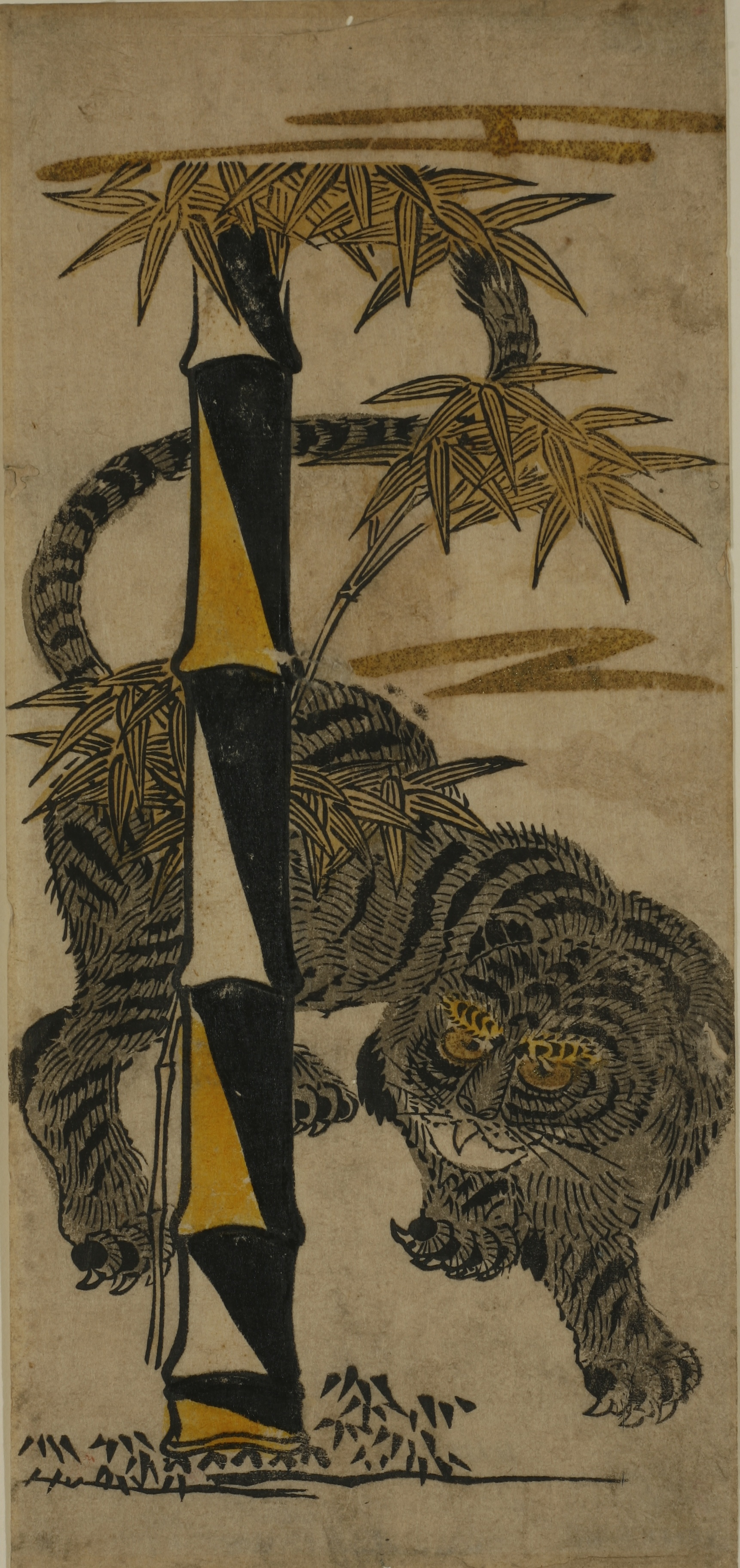
Tiger and Bamboo, c. 1725
Uki-e by Okumura Masanobu

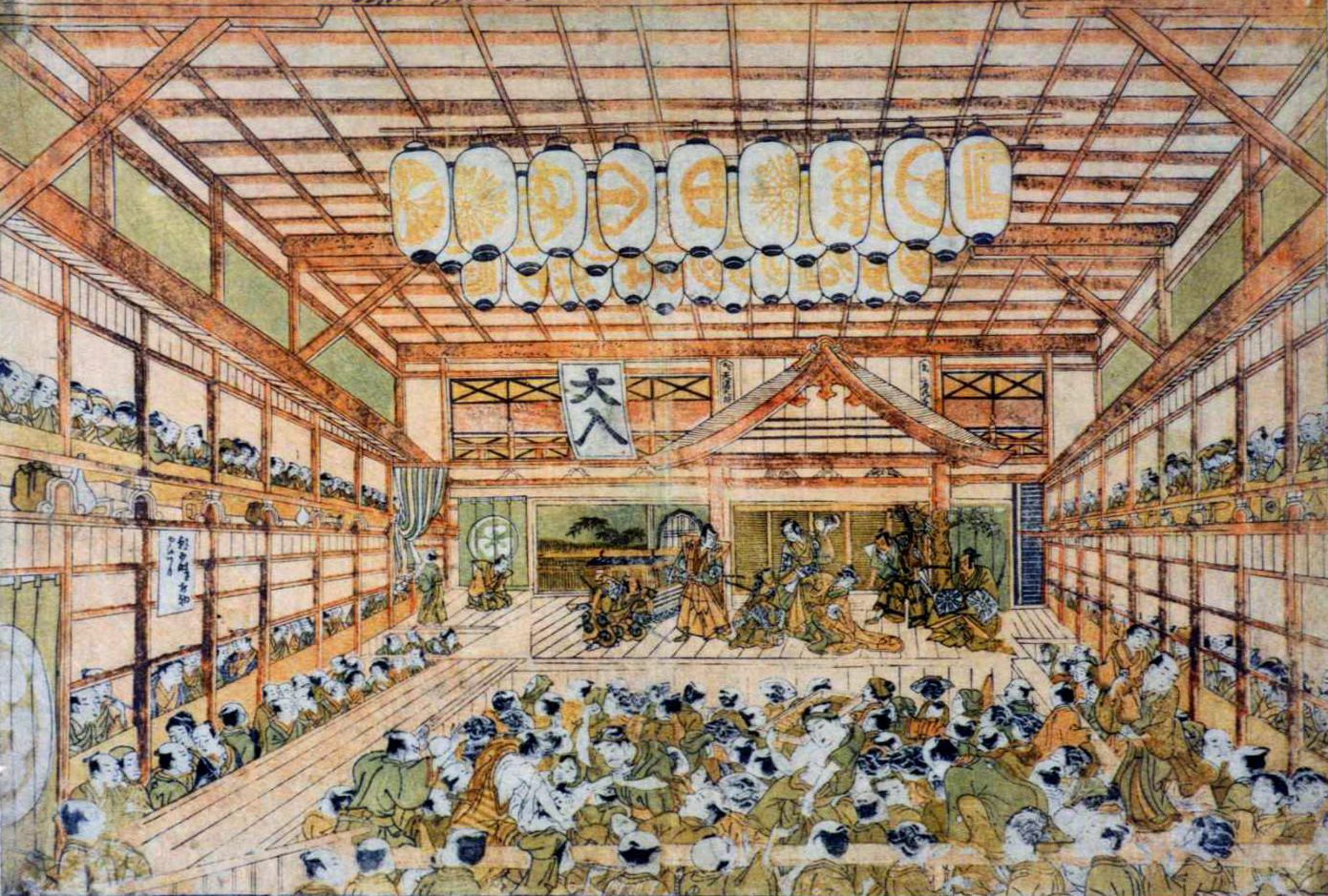
Morita-za

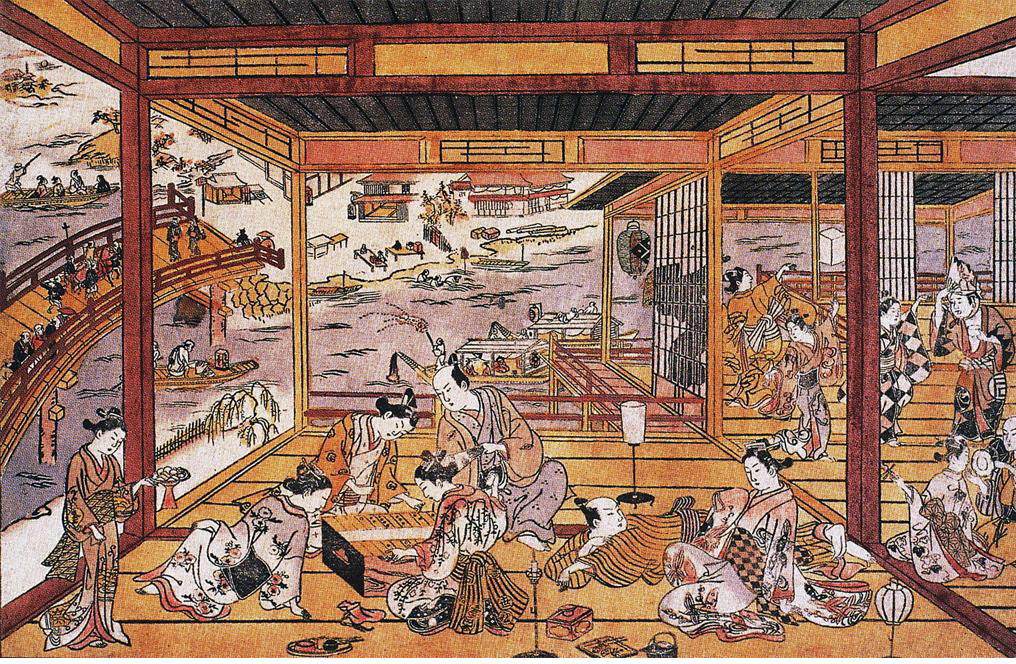
Taking the Evening Cool by Ryōgoku Bridge, 1745

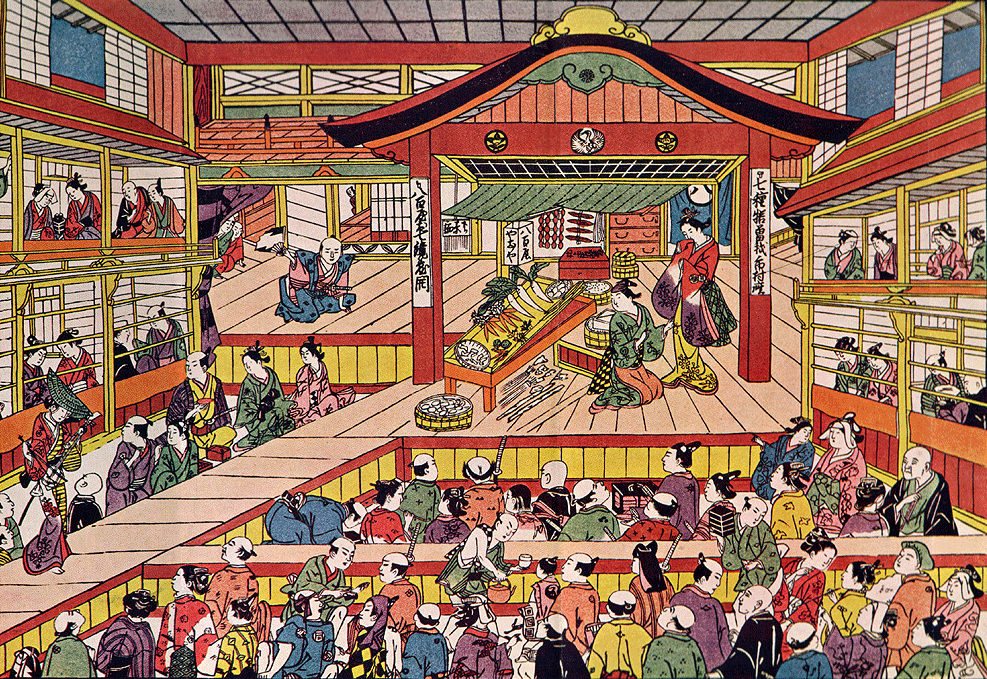
Shibai Uki-e, c. 1741–44

== Legacy ==
The era Masanobu was born into was a prosperous and creatively fertile one, in which flourished the haiku poets Matsuo Bashō and Ihara Saikaku, the bunraku dramatist Chikamatsu Monzaemon, and the painter Ogata Kōrin. Masanobu was one of the most influential innovators of the ukiyo-e form, introducing the comic album, the pillar, two-colour, and lacquer prints, and popularizing Western-style perspective drawing. His career saw ukiyo-e evolve from its monochromatic origins to the verge of the full-colour nishiki-e revolution of Suzuki Harunobu's time.

Though less known to the public than masters such as Sharaku and Hokusai, Masanobu has gained the regard of connoisseurs as one of the greatest ukiyo-e artists, held in esteem by Japanese collectors such as Kiyoshi Shibui and Seiichirō Takahashi, and Westerners such as Ernest Fenollosa, Arthur Davison Ficke, and James A. Michener.
