= Torii Kiyomasu =

Japanese painter and printmaker

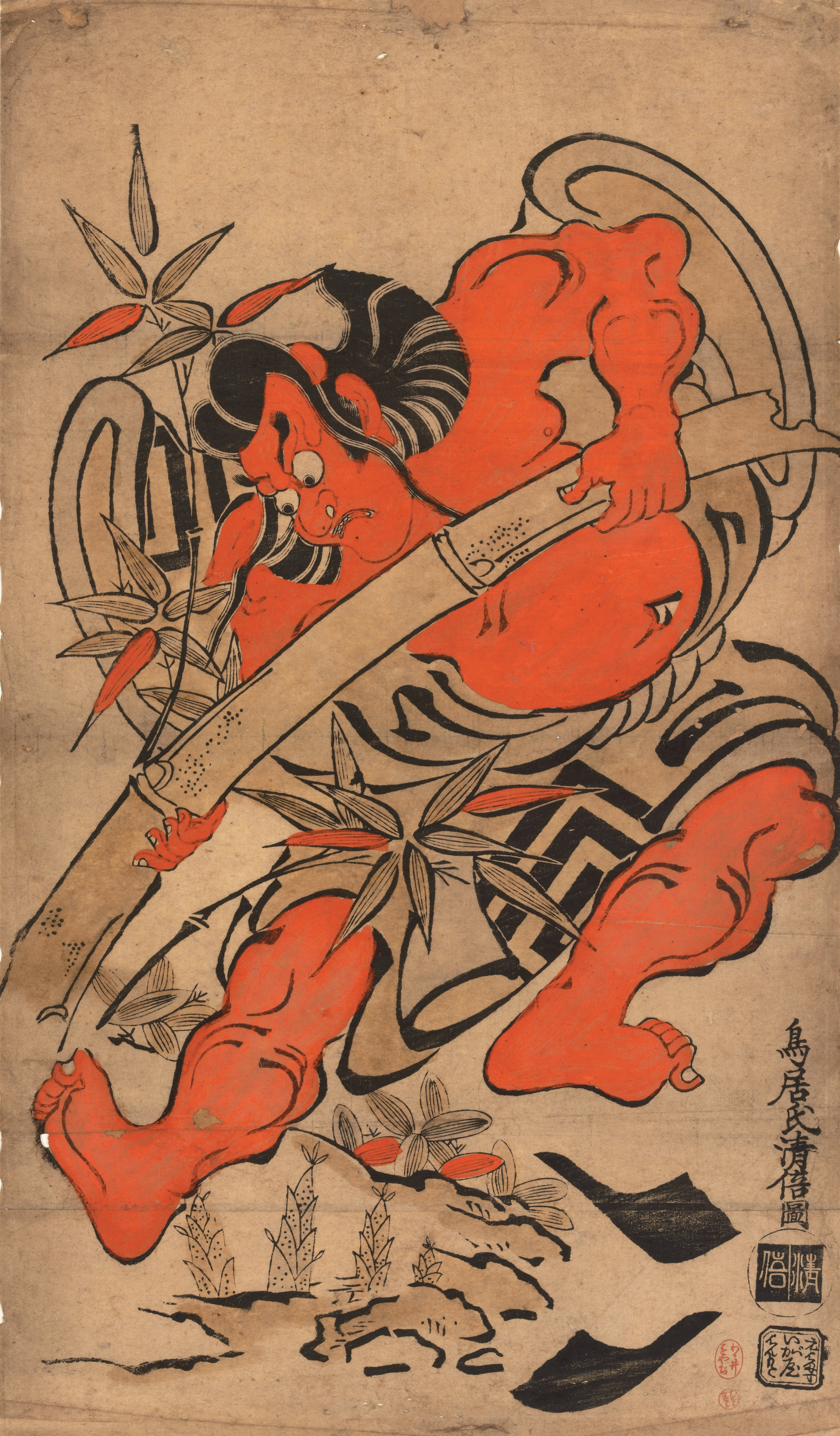
Ichikawa Danjūrō I in the role of Takenuki Gorō. Likely one of the most famous of all early Torii works, and the most famous depiction of Danjūrō I.

Torii Kiyomasu (鳥居 清倍; fl. 1690s–1720s) was a Japanese painter and printmaker of the Torii school, in the genre of ukiyo-e. Like the other Torii artists, his primary focus was on Kabuki billboards, advertisements, actor prints, and other related material. Many scholars believe Kiyomasu to have been the younger brother or son of Torii Kiyonobu I, one of the founders of the school, or to have been an alternate art-name (gō) for the same man.

In the 1710s, prints signed with Kiyomasu's name far outnumber those with the signature of Kiyonobu. If the two were distinct artists, this could indicate that the elder artist, the head of the school, devoted more time to the kabuki billboards and other works which were more the official province of the workshop, while the younger was left to do prints. On the other hand, even if the two were the same person, this could simply be explained by the use of different names on different types of work.

Though his style is said to be somewhat more graceful than Kiyonobu's, they are difficult to tell apart, as are most works by other Torii artists. However, there are certain stylistic elements that do stand out as differences between the two artists. While Kiyonobu's work was based largely on that of Hishikawa Moronobu, and was very masculine in nature, with sharp, bold lines, Kiyomasu's works, while very similar at first glance, are in fact softer and more graceful; they are said to show a "lack of seriousness of intent". This shift is attributed to an emulation of the styles of Moronobu's chief competitor, Sugimura Jihei.

Kiyomasu's compositional development can best be traced in his horizontal scenes of two or three theatrical figures datable to 1715–1717, in which the relationships between figures, while not dramatic, are certainly narrative in character; this is in contrast to his later actor prints, where multiple figures are more often united by a purely pictorial background and individual pose and expression are given greater emphasis, and which are closer in spirit to the earlier lateral compositions of the Yamato-e masters. Kiyomasu was not as bold or surprising an innovator as Kiyonobu, but he established an ideal of flowing grace that would dominate the work of the Torii school for the following fifty years: it was Kiyonobu who established the school's bold, dynamic strength, but it was Kiyomasu who adapted that style to portray beauty, both on stage and in the wider world. Kiyomasu is thought to have stopped working in the early 1720s, and is presumed to have died relatively young.

== See also ==
- Torii Kiyomasu II

== Furthere readings ==
- Lane, Richard. (1978). Images from the Floating World, The Japanese Print. Oxford: Oxford University Press. ISBN 9780192114471; OCLC 5246796
