= Torii school =

School of ukiyo-e painting and printing in Edo (now Tokyo), Japan

The Torii school (鳥居派, -ha) was a school of ukiyo-e painting and printing founded in Edo. The primary producers of kabuki theater signboards and other promotional materials, the Torii were among those whose work led to the development of ukiyo-e. Their style was one of the primary influences in the ukiyo-e depiction of actors and kabuki scenes for much of the 18th century. Still today, kabuki signboards are sometimes painted by members of the Torii family.

== History ==
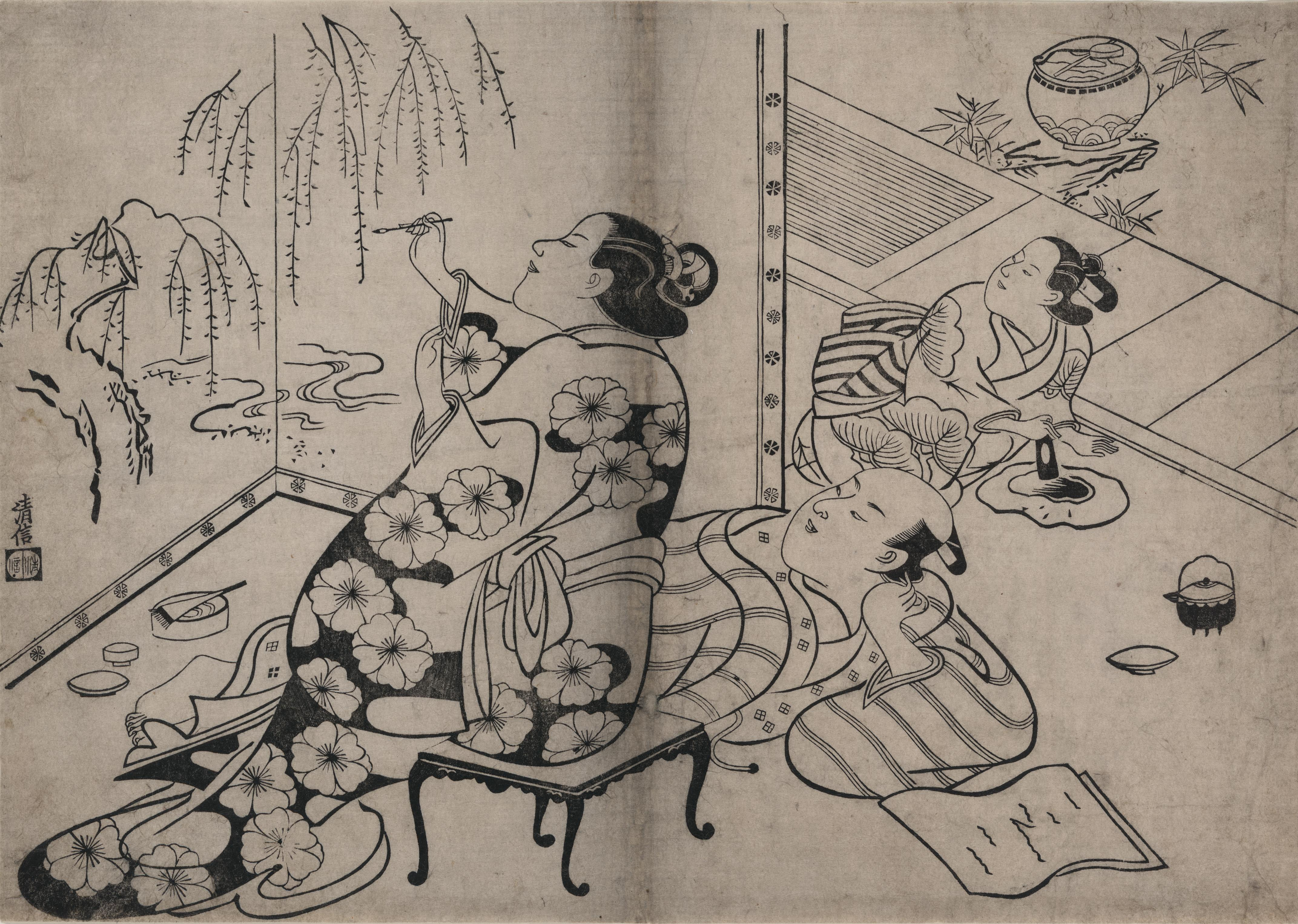
Torii Kiyonobu - Courtesan painting a screen

The Torii style truly emerged with Torii Kiyonobu I, who came to Edo in 1687. The Torii family had already been active in the kabuki world, in Osaka, for several generations at this point.

The school's founder, Torii Kiyomoto (1645–1702), whose real name was Kondō, was an Osaka kabuki actor known as Shōshichi Torii who also painted advertising posters for his own theatrical troupe; none of his works survive today. He settled in Edo in 1687 together with his twenty-four-year-old son Shōbei, later known as Torii Kiyonobu I (1664–1729), and in 1690 produced the first poster for the Ichimura-za theatre, establishing a professional kabuki-poster style that his son would later refine. Father and son together founded a painting school that would come to dominate the production of kabuki posters and promotional material well into the 20th century.

He studied under Yoshida Hanbei and Hishikawa Moronobu, and brought a kabuki sensibility to their artistic styles. Moronobu's work was already dramatic and energetic, but Kiyonobu added to this with a further emphasis on action, and on the types of poses (see mie) and aesthetics one would see on the kabuki stage. For many years, Kiyonobu and his actor father Torii Kiyomoto produced primarily theater signboards, book illustrations, and promotional materials for the theaters.

It was not until 1700 that the Torii began to create full-size paintings and prints that could be interpreted as independent works of art. Many still depicted actors and the kabuki world, and could therefore be construed as serving as promotional materials. But by this time Kiyonobu, and his successor Torii Kiyonobu II, were also producing paintings and prints of courtesans, erotic scenes, and sumo.

Even as the Torii school expanded, and began to produce works in the increasingly popular form of paintings and prints, the core purpose of the clan remained the production of billboards, posters, and other theatrical works. As such, Kiyonobu, and the heads of the clan after him, worked primarily on these types of works, leaving relatively few paintings and prints.

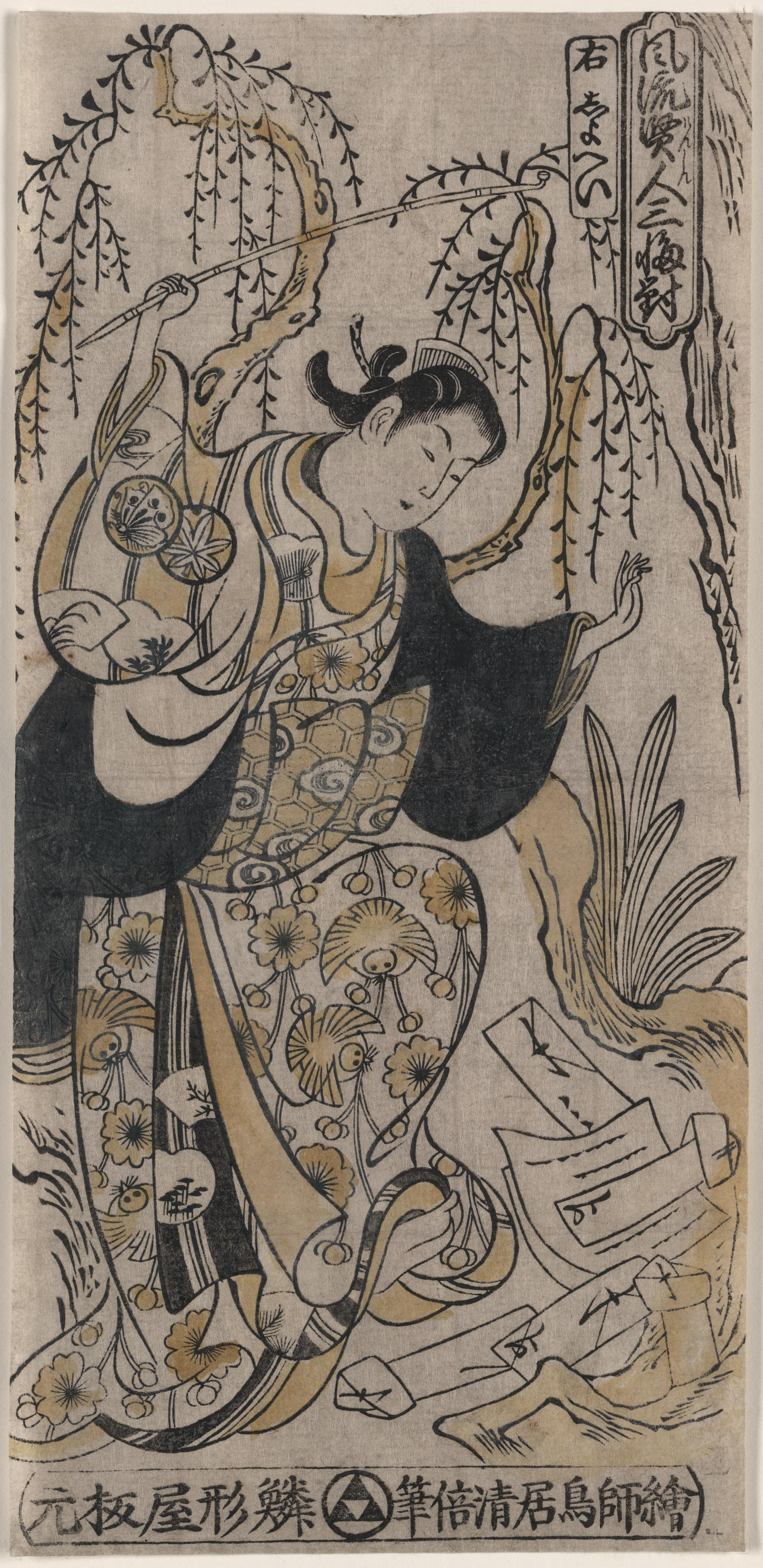
Torii Kiyomasu – Sanjo Kantaro

Torii Kiyomasu, and his successors, would represent something of a departure from the theatrical and energetic core style of the Torii school. Taking Sugimura Jihei as a role model, rather than Moronobu, Kiyomasu produced works far softer, more delicate and graceful than those of many other Torii artists. Nevertheless, many works by these other artists, who produced more dramatic works in Kiyonobu's style, are signed "Kiyomasu".

Even as other schools and styles emerged over the course of the 18th century, the Torii style remained at the core of ukiyo-e. It was something every artist had to either embrace and elaborate on, or to reject entirely. The Torii style, even in paintings and prints, continued to be derived directly from the clan's work for the kabuki theaters. Their style was bombastic, dramatic, and somewhat idealized. One of the primary elements of their particular style was the use of bold, thick lines, attracting the eye of the viewer, and giving the composition an overall boldness. This element was embraced by a number of artists, particularly the Kaigetsudō school.

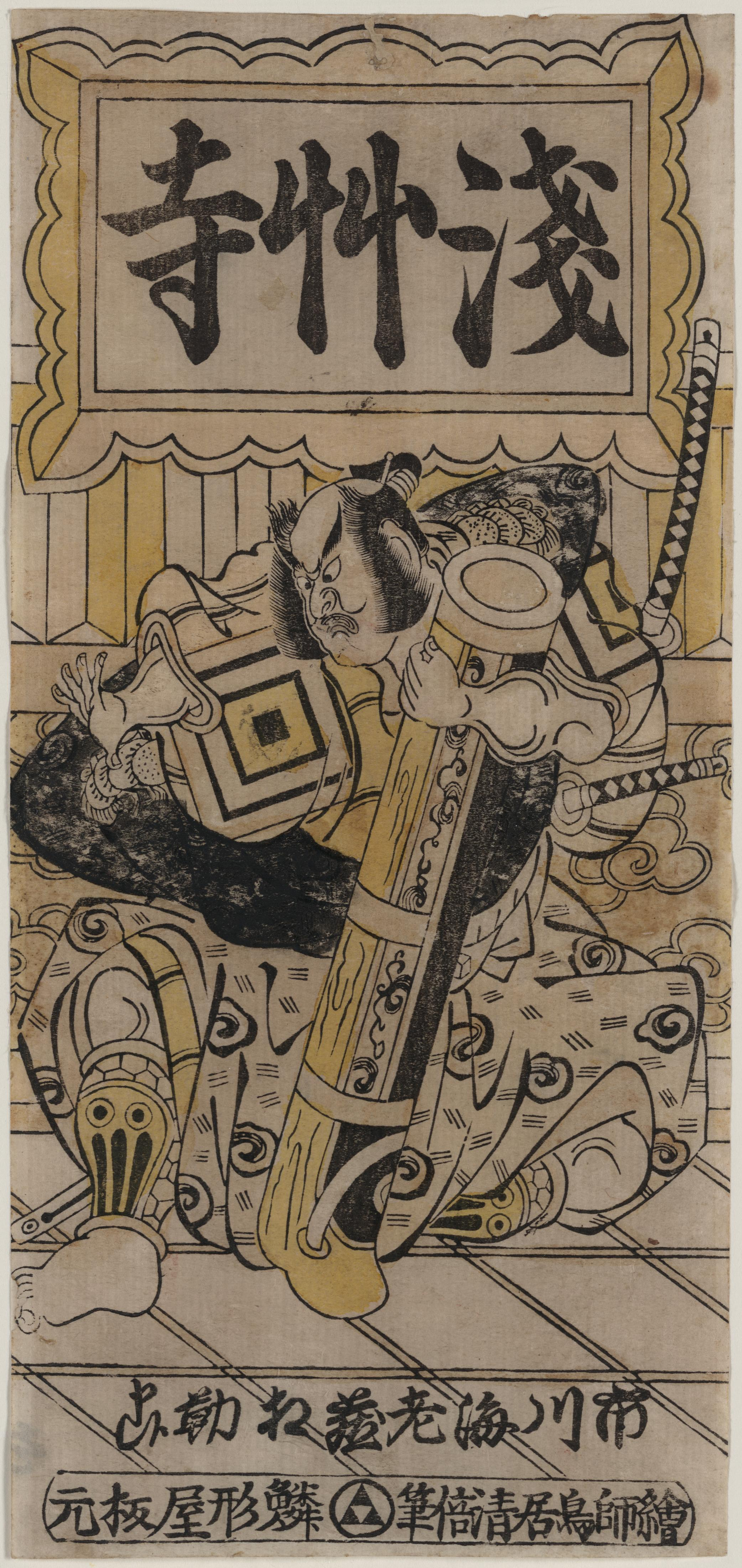
Torii Kiyomasu II - Ichikawa Ebizō aitsutome moshi soro

Torii Kiyonobu II and Kiyomasu II, the second generation of the school, saw it to its climax. Both artists were active from the 1720s to the 1760s, and consolidated the bolder style of Kiyonobu with the more graceful, delicate style of Kiyomasu. They helped develop the Torii style away from the early, primitive forms of Moronobu and into something that formed a key part of the mainstream style of ukiyo-e. They also, however, experimented with the use of urushi-e, using lacquer for deeper, bolder lines, and brass or other metal dust to add a sparkle to their works. Torii school artists used a color called "tan-e", a lead-based orange color, to achieve tones for clothing and body tones. However, Kiyonobu II used color contrasts like pink-green, rather than the yellow-orange contrast used by his masters.

The works of Torii Kiyohiro, Kiyomitsu, and Kiyotsune, all active in the 1750s to 1770s, continued the tradition of their forebears. By this point, the school more or less defined the core of mainstream ukiyo-e style. These artists' figures are more graceful and delicate, and less bold, than those of their predecessors. But they were also some of the first to experiment with benizuri-e, or "rose prints"; at this time, printers began to use color on the woodblocks, coloring the prints directly during production, instead of by hand afterwards. Before this technique was adopted, Torii artists applied yellow, tan (a lead-based orange), urushi (lacquer), and beni pigments by hand; the shift to block-printed colour itself, achieved in 1741, is credited to the Torii school as pioneers of the process. Up to five different colors could be used in one print, but the overall effect was still far simpler than the nishiki-e (multicolored "brocade" prints) which would emerge later. The artistic developments and adaptions by Kiyomitsu, allowed for a specific style of the Torii School, which was called "Ie-No-Ho." With students learning directly from their masters, knowledge was passed down from master to student in the manner of "Ie-No-Ho". While there was a set "style", each head artist of the school had their own personal approach and subtle changes. For example, Kiyonobu II printed rather than painted like his predecessors, because of the new medium of the woodblock print.

Katsukawa Shunshō and Sharaku, two of the greatest artists to reject the Torii style, pioneered attempts to represent the theater, and actors, realistically. They continued to instill a great degree of drama and bombast into their works, but showed actors as actors, not as the roles which they played. Most crucially, they depicted artists as individuals, representing facial features and actors' personalities such that each individual actor could be identified despite their role, and the makeup and costume that went with it. Though these artists were extremely successful, and eclipsed the Torii artists to some extent, the Torii remained influential and successful as well.

In the 1770s, Torii Kiyonaga emerged as the new great artist of his time, bringing the Torii school back to the forefront, but presenting his own unique stylistic adaptations. Kiyonaga would come to be regarded as one of the greatest of all ukiyo-e artists, but also the last of the great Torii artists. He retained much of the core of the Torii style, the drama, energy, and theatrical sensibility, but sought a degree of realism and individuality in his depictions of actors even beyond what Sharaku and Shunshō attained. He depicted the urban culture of Edo with a realism previously unseen, and is widely credited with perfecting or mastering many other elements of the ukiyo-e genre. However, he too retired from the world of prints to focus on the theater signboards which were the true work of the Torii school.

Though Kiyonaga is generally regarded as the final great master of the Torii school, the school continued to produce theater materials, paintings and prints; more importantly, Kiyonaga's style, and that of his predecessors, continued to influence the next wave of ukiyo-e artists.

== Significant artists of the school ==
- Torii Kiyohiro (Wikimedia commons)
- Torii Kiyomasu I
- Torii Kiyomasu II
- Torii Kiyomine
- Torii Kiyomitsu
- Torii Kiyomoto
- Torii Kiyonobu I
- Torii Kiyonobu II
- Torii Kiyonaga
- Torii Kiyoshige
- Torii Kiyotada I
- Torii Kiyotada VII
- Torii Kiyotsune
- Torii Kotondo
