= Torii Kiyonobu II =

18th-century Japanese ukiyo-e artist

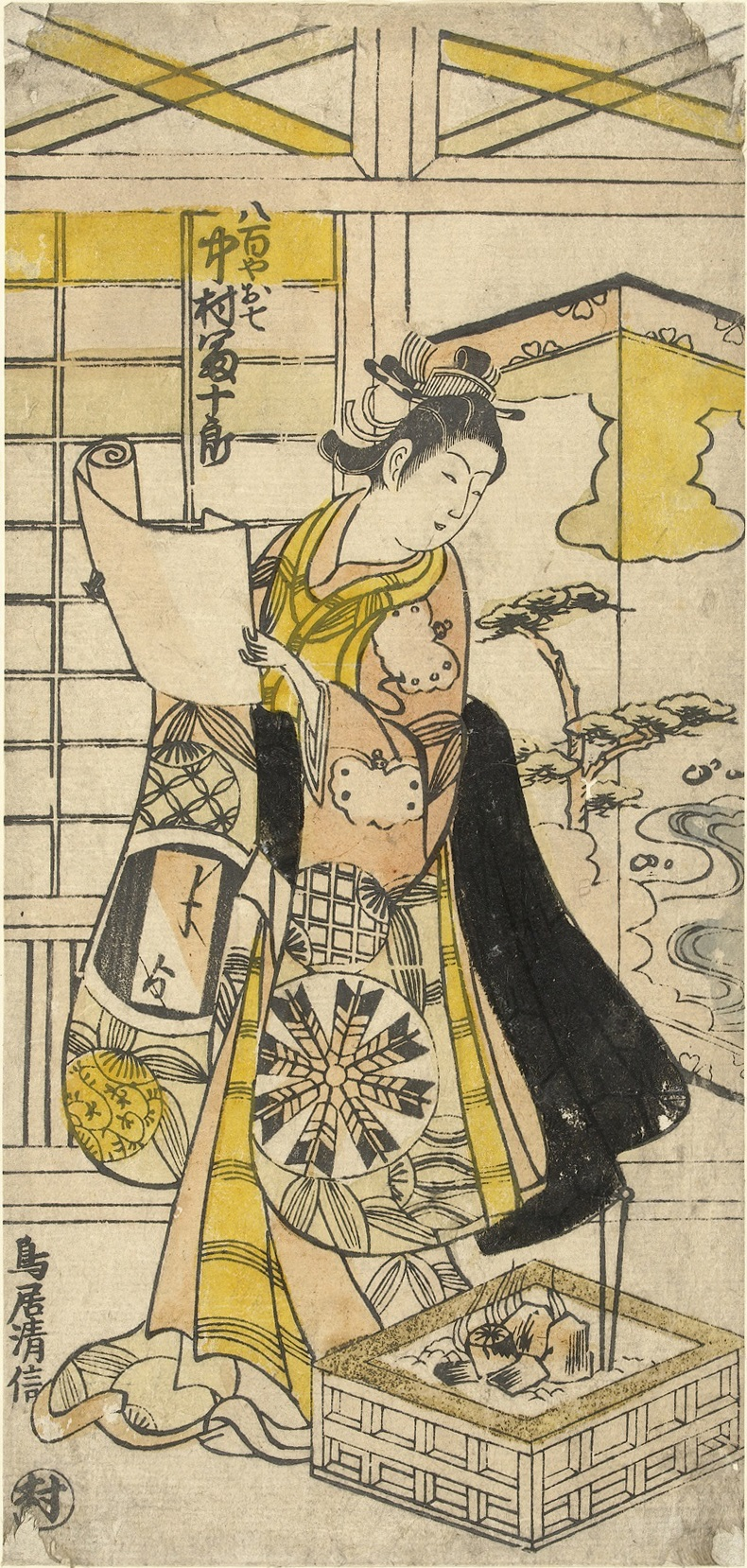
The Actor Nakamura Tomijūrō I in the Role of Yaoya Oshichi Woodblock print, Torii Kiyonobu II, c. 1742

Torii Kiyonobu II (Japanese: 二代目 鳥居 清信 Nidaime Torii Kiyonobu; active 1725–1760) was a Japanese ukiyo-e artist. He headed the Torii artistic school from possibly as early as 1725, when its founder Torii Kiyonobu I retired. Kiyonobu II was a prolific designer of actor prints, principally in the narrow hosoban format, of which he produced at least 300 examples for about 20 different publishers. He and Torii Kiyomasu II were the main Torii artists of their time and have been rumoured to be the same person. Kiyonobu II's last known work is an actor print dated to 1760.
