= Torii Kiyomasu II =

Japanese ukiyo-e painter and woodblock printer (c. 1720-1750)

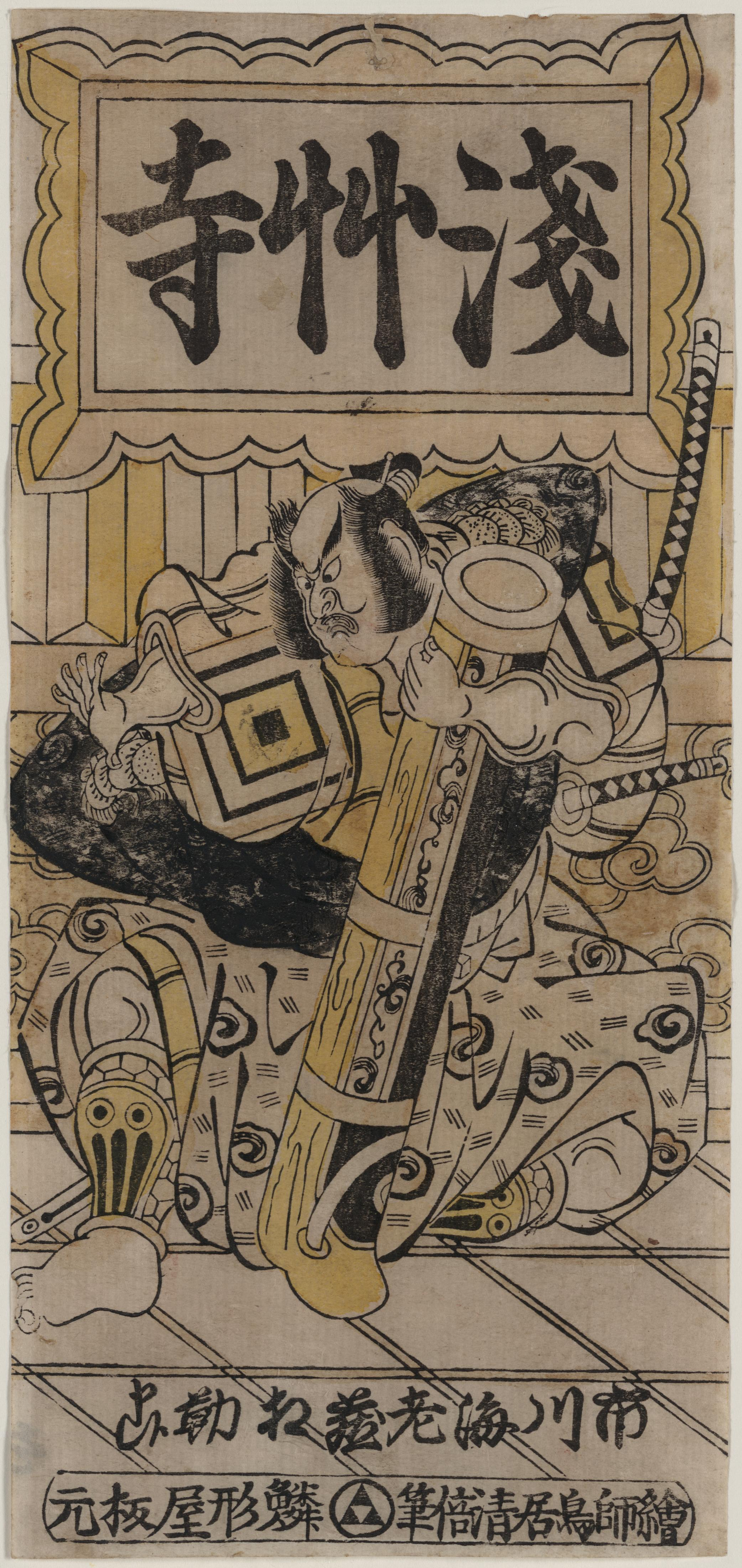
Ichikawa Ebizō aitsutome moshi soro - Kiyomasu's print of the actor Ichikawa Ebizō on stage.

Torii Kiyomasu II (鳥居 清倍; c. 1720–1750) was a Japanese ukiyo-e painter and woodblock printmaker of the Torii school, a specialist, like the rest of the Torii artists, in billboards and other images for the promotion of the kabuki theatres. Scholars are unsure as to Kiyomasu II's relation to the original Kiyomasu who came a few decades earlier; they may have been close relations, or master and student, or they may have been the same man. A separate theory holds instead that Kiyomasu II and Torii Kiyonobu II were themselves the same person, though the broader question of the use of the names Kiyonobu and Kiyomasu during this period remains far from resolved.

His prints, like many at the time, were made largely using the urushi-e (lacquer print) and benizuri-e (rose print) methods; the lines or outlines of the prints themselves would often be in monochrome or a limited number of colors and the rest would be done by hand.

Richard Lane writes that the majority of Kiyomasu's work is "quite stereotyped, lacking in vitality or fertility of invention." He writes the same of the works of Torii Kiyonobu II, but says of both artists that "in perhaps a quarter of their prints they manage to rise above the confines of their own limited talents and produce work of rare grace and charm."
