= Torii Kiyonobu I =

Japanese painter and printmaker (c. 1664-1729)

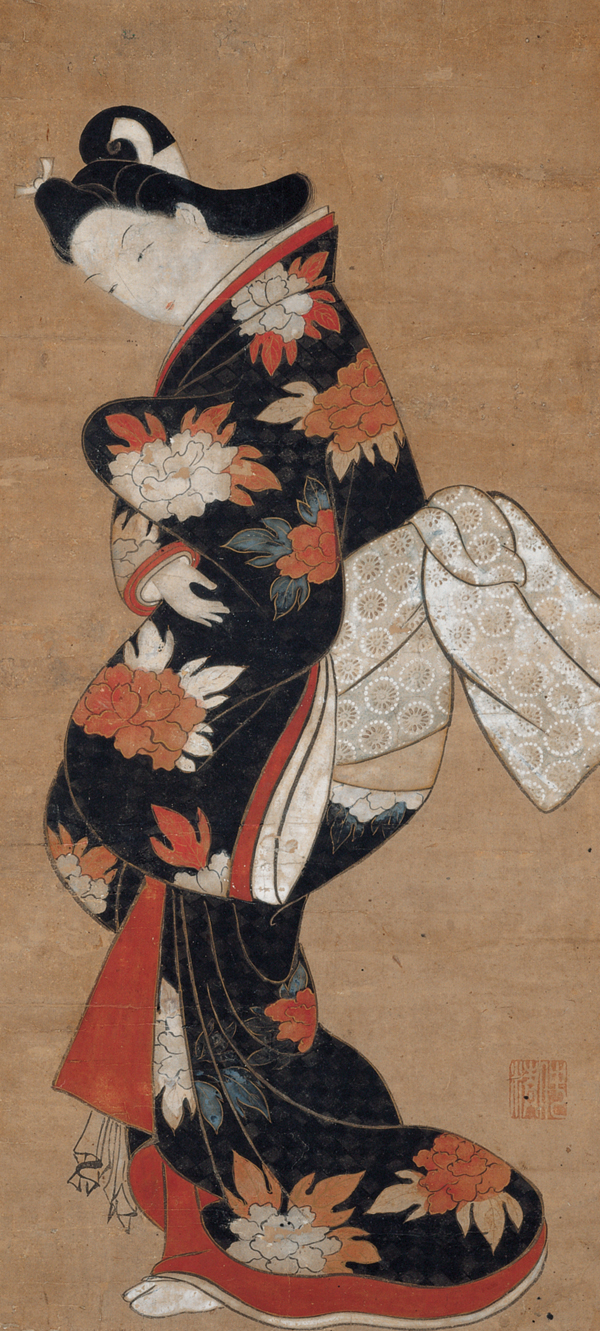
Beauty in a Black Kimono by Torii Kiyonobu, c. 1710–20, Japan, Edo period, Hanging scroll; ink, colors, and gold on paper

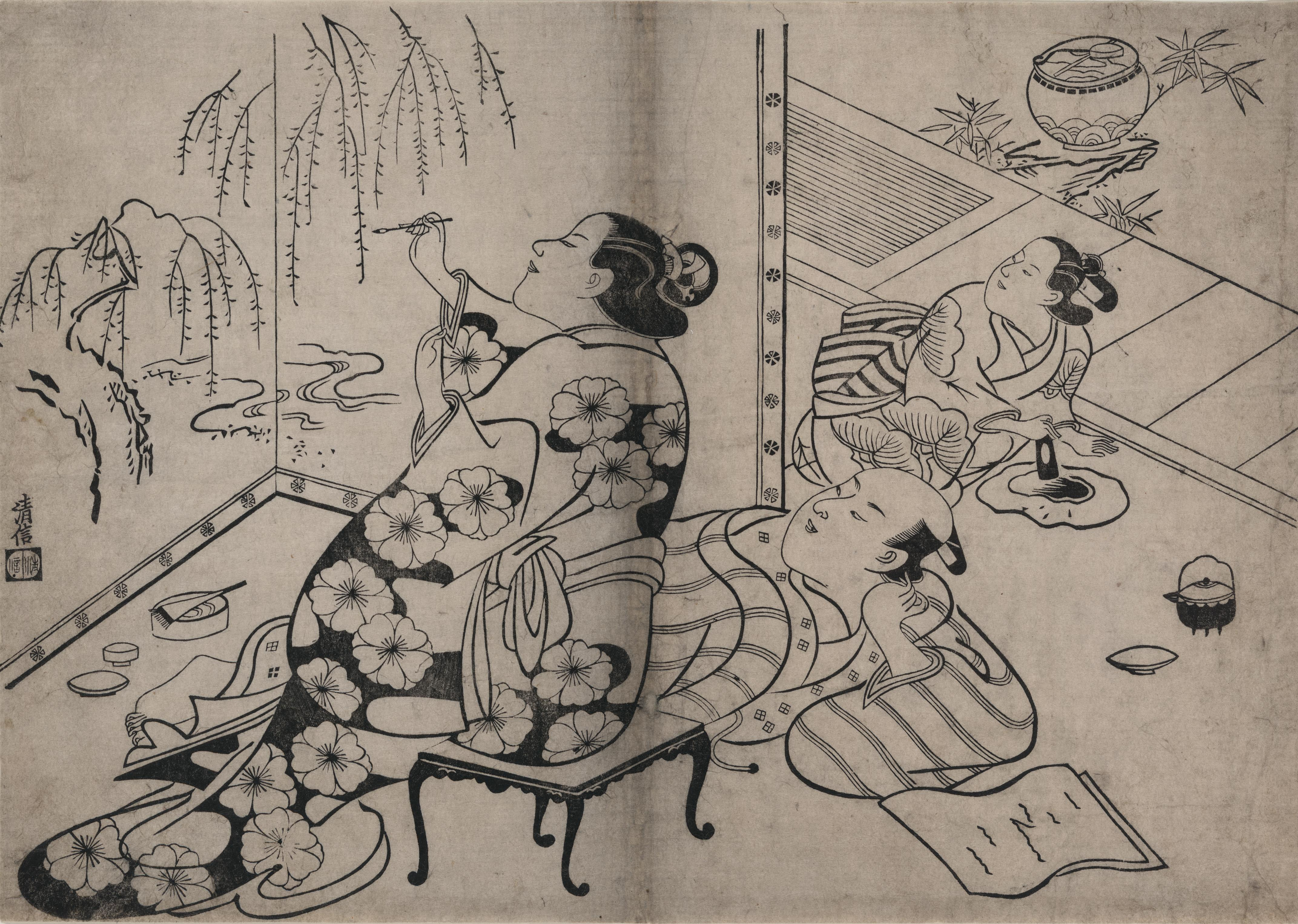
"Courtesan painting a screen", 18th century ukiyo-e woodblock print by Kiyonobu.

Torii Kiyonobu I (Japanese: 鳥居 清信; c. 1664 – 22 August 1729) was a Japanese painter and printmaker in the ukiyo-e style, who is renowned for his work on kabuki signboards and related materials. Along with his father Torii Kiyomoto, he is said to have been one of the founders of the Torii school of painting.

Known in childhood as Shōbei, young Kiyonobu was the second son of the established Osaka kabuki actor and painter Torii Kiyomoto, born in 1664. He moved, with his father, to Edo (modern Tokyo) when he was twenty-four, and emerged there as a major artist with a unique style. Kiyonobu's work is regarded as being highly influenced by that of Hishikawa Moronobu (d. 1694), the father of ukiyo-e; Kiyonobu would also have been well-versed, as most major artists were at the time, in the styles of the Kanō and Tosa schools.

Kiyonobu focused almost exclusively on producing billboards and other promotional material for Edo's kabuki theaters; the relationship between the theaters and the Torii school was a strong and important one, and one that continues today. Guided by the need to attract attention, Kiyonobu's style tended towards bold, colorful exuberance. In addition to a distinctive use of color, details, and various other aesthetic elements, the Torii style is especially distinguished by the use of thick, bold line.

By 1700, Kiyonobu was a fully established and accomplished artist. His works were praised by contemporary writers, and were often even placed in Shintō shrines as votive offerings, a fact which indicates something of the artistic quality or emotional impact of his depictions of Kabuki actors. By the time of his death in 1729, Kiyonobu had not only painted a great number of signboards and the like, but had also produced illustrations for woodblock printed books, depicting kabuki dramas, and had issued individual prints as well.

According to some accounts, Kiyonobu I retired in 1725, passing leadership of the Torii school to Torii Kiyonobu II, a prolific yakusha-e artist working mainly in the hosoban format, who is known to have produced at least three hundred works for around twenty different publishers between 1726 and 1760.

As is the case with most Torii school artists, Kiyonobu's dates are not known for sure, and the relationships between the various Torii artists are similarly unclear. The styles of Kiyonobu's disciples and relatives are very similar, and most scholars entertain the possibility that Kiyonobu II or Kiyomasu I were the same man as the subject of this article, Kiyonobu I, or as one another. Very few, if any, paintings created by the Torii school are known definitely to have been painted by any one particular artist.

== See also ==
- Torii Kiyonobu II – Kiyonobu's successor as head of the Torii school, and likely his son
- Torii Kiyomasu – a contemporary of Kiyonobu, in a somewhat different style. Kiyomasu may have been Kiyonobu's brother, or they may have even been the same man.
