= Richard Douglas Lane =

American art historian

Richard Douglas Lane (1926–2002) was an American art critic, collector, dealer, historian, and writer. He was dealer of Japanese art, lived in Japan for much of his life, and had a long association with the Honolulu Museum of Art in Hawaii, which now holds his vast art collection.

== Life and career ==
Lane was born in Kissimmee, Florida. After graduating from high school in 1944, during World War II, he enlisted in the United States Marine Corps. In the Marines he trained as a Japanese translator, and served in Japan during the war. He later received a bachelor's degree from the University of Hawaii in Japanese and Chinese literature, and continued his studies at Columbia University, where he earned a master's degree and a PhD in 18th-century Japanese literature. In 1957, Lane moved to Japan, where he lived for the rest of his life.

Lane was never on a university faculty, but supported himself as an author, dealer and consultant. He was a visiting research associate at the Honolulu Museum of Art from 1957 to 1971, during which time he helped catalog the James A. Michener collection of Japanese prints. In 1960 Lane married physician Chiyeko Okawa; they remained married until her death in 1999. In 2002, he died intestate and without heirs in Kyoto, Japan, and the Honolulu Museum of Art purchased his collection from the Japanese judicial authorities. The Lane Collection consisted of nearly 20,000 paintings, prints and books.

From October 2008 to February 2009, the Honolulu Museum of Art exhibited a sampling of the collection under the title "Richard Lane and the Floating World". From March 2010 to June 2010, the museum exhibited a second installment of the collection under the title "Masterpieces from the Richard Lane Collection".

Among the works in the Richard Lane "Arts of the Bedchamber: Japanese Shunga," which included over 50 erotic paintings, prints, and woodblock-printed books from the Lane Collection.

== Publications ==
Richard Lane's publications include:

- Lane, Richard, Shinpen Shoki Hanga: Makurae (Shunga: The Ukiyo-e Primitives), Tokyo, Gakken, 1995. ISBN 4-05-500146-0
- Lane, Richard(contributor); Hayashi, Yoshikazu; Kamiya, Hoshu, Oya, Kyoko; Okumura, Masanobu et al. (editors). Teihon Ukiyo-e Shunga Meihin Shusei (The Complete Ukiyo-e Shunga), Tokyo, Kawade Shobo Shinsha. 26 volumes published between 1995 and 2000.
  - Hatsuharu irogonomi: Katsushika hokusai (初春色ごよみ : 葛飾北齊). Supplemental Vol.3 (Bekkan), 2000. ISBN 4309910386, NAID BA51905822.
  - Azuma-otoko ni kyo-onna: Harukawa Goshichi, Ehon tegoto no hana (あづま男に京おんな : 春川五七 會本手事之發名). Supplemental Vol.2 (Bekkan), 2000. ISBN 430991036X, NCID BA46825305.
  - Sode no maki: Torii Kiyonaga and more: Nishiki-e hashira-e yokoban higa-kan (鳥居清長 袖の巻 : 他 : 錦絵柱絵横判秘画巻), Vol.24, 1999. ISBN 4309910343, NCID BA41011500
  - Ehon komachi-biki; Kitagawa Utamaro (喜多川歌麿 絵本小町引 : 大判錦絵秘画帖). Vol.2 Collectors’ edition, 1998, ISBN 4309911021, NCID BA3993278X.
  - Emmusubi Izumo no sugi: Chuban nishiki-e higa-cho (葛飾北斎 縁結出雲杉 : 中判錦絵秘画帖). Vol.1 Collectors’ edition, 1998, ISBN 4309911013, NCID BA39932407.
  - Fukujusou: Oban nishiki-e higa-cho (葛飾北斎 富久寿楚宇 : 大判錦絵秘画帖). Vol.23, 1998, ISBN 4309910335, NCID BA38727140.
  - Koshoku hanazakari and others; Sugimura Jihei: Oban, Chuban te-zaishiki higa-cho (杉村次兵衛 好色花盛り : 他 : 大判・中判手彩色秘画帖). Vol.22, 1998, ISBN 4309910327, NCID BA37603186.
  - Furyu edo hakkei and others; Suzuki Harunobu: Chuban nishiki-e higa-cho (鈴木春信 風流江戸八景 他 : 中判錦絵秘画帖). Vol.21, 1998, ISBN 4309910319, NCID BA37602252.
  - Koi no kiwami; Hishikawa Moronobu: Oban nishiki-e higa-cho (菱川師宣 恋の極み : 大判手彩色秘画帖). Vol.20, 1998, ISBN 4309910300, NCID BA36135388.↵
  - Edo no haru; ihojin mankai: etange elotique. (江戸の春・異邦人満開 : エトランジェ・エロティック). Supplemental volume (別巻), 1998. ISBN 4309910351, NCID BA35313152.
  - Koshibagaki soshi: Higa emaki (小柴垣草子 : 秘画絵巻). Vo.17, 1997, ISBN 4309910270, NCID BA32961870.↵
  - Negai no itoguchi; Kitagawa Utamaro: Oban nishiki-e higa-cho (喜多川歌麿 ねがひの糸ぐち : 大判錦絵秘画帖). Vol.15, 1997, ISBN 4309910254, NCID BA32961600.
  - Tui no hina; Katsushika Hokusai: Oban nishiki-e higa-cho (葛飾北斎 つひの雛形 : 大判錦絵秘画帖). Vol.13, 1997, ISBN 4309910238, NCID BA31673575.
  - Shikido torikumi juniban; Isoda Koryusai: Oban nishiki-e higa-cho (磯田湖龍斎 色道取組十二番). Vol.3, Collectors’ edition. (大判錦絵秘画帖 愛蔵版). 1998. ISBN 430991103X, NCID BA3993308X.
  - Ehon komachi-biki: Oban nishi-e higa-cho (喜多川歌麿 絵本小町引: 大判錦絵秘画帖). Vol.2, 1996, ISBN 4309910122, NCID BA32953227.
  - Azuma nishiki; Katsushika Hokusai: Oban nishi-e higa-cho (葛飾北斎 東にしき : 大判錦絵秘画帖). Vol.7, 1996, ISBN 4309910173, NCID BA31423749.
  - Fubi no seisho: Oban urushi-e higa-shu (婦美の清書 : 大判漆絵秘画帖). Vol.9, Collectors’ edition (愛蔵版), 1998. ISBN 430991019X, NCID BA31423658.↵
  - Shitone no hinagata: Oban urushi-e higa-shu (閨の雛形 : 大判漆絵秘画集). Vol.11, Collectors’ edition (別巻愛蔵版), 1998. ISBN 4309910211, NCID BA31422746.
  - Haru no yuki; Ikeda Eisen: Kamban nishiki-e higacho (池田英泉 春の薄雪 : 間判錦絵秘画帖). Vol.5 Collector's edition, 1996. ISBN 4309910157, NCID BA31418953.
  - Emmusubi izumo sugi; Katsushika Hokusai: Chuban nishiki-e higacho (葛飾北斎 縁結び出雲杉：中判錦絵秘画帖). Vol.1, 1995. ISBN 4309910114, NCID BA32951174.
- Lane, Richard "Kesareta shunga wo abaku" ("消された春画"を暴く), from Special: Ukiyoe kesareta shunga. Geijutsu shincho, pp.4-40, Volume 6, Number 45, ISSN 0435-1657, Shinchosha, June 1994. NAID 40000935384.
- Lane, Richard, Masterpieces of Japanese Prints: The European Collections Ukiyo-e from the Victoria and Albert Museum, New York, Kodansha America Inc, 1991. ISBN 978-4-7700-1613-3.
- Lane, Richard, Hokusai, Life and Work, New York, Dutton, 1989. ISBN 0-525-24455-7.
- Lane, Richard, Erotica Japonica: Masterworks of Shunga Painting, New York, Japan Publications, 1986. ISBN 0-87040-665-5.
- Lane, Richard, Ukiyo-e Holschnitte. Künstler und Werke, Zürich, 1978.
- Lane, Richard, Images from the Floating World: The Japanese Print, Including an Illustrated Dictionary of Ukiyo-e, New York, Putnam, 1978. ISBN 0-399-12193-5.
- Lane, Richard Douglas, Hokusai to Hiroshige, Köln, Galerie Eike Moog, 1977. English and Japanese, with one pamphlet in German.OCLC 844790928. Based on Hokusai and Hiroshige, Tokyo : Gakubundō, 1976, in English and Japanese, OCLC 1111408815.
- Lane, Richard, Japanische Holzschnitte, München Zürich, Droemersche, 1964, in German.
- Lane, Richard; Arbour-Brackman, Renée (translator). L'Estampe Japonaise, Paris, Aimery Somogy, 1962, in French. OCLC 750521964.
- Lane, Richard, Masters of the Japanese Print, Their World and Their Work (The Arts of Man series), Garden City, N.Y., Doubleday, 1962. One-hour free access.
- Lane, Richard, Masters of the Japanese Print, Their World and Their Work (The Arts of Man series), Garden City, N.Y., Doubleday, 1962.
- Michener, James A. with notes on the prints by Richard Lane, Japanese Prints, From the Early Masters to the Modern, Rutland, Vermont, Charles E. Tuttle Company, 1959.
- Michener, James A. with notes on the prints by Richard Lane, Japanese Prints, From the Early Masters to the Modern, Rutland, Vermont, Charles E. Tuttle Company, 1959.
