= Yakusha-e =

Art genre

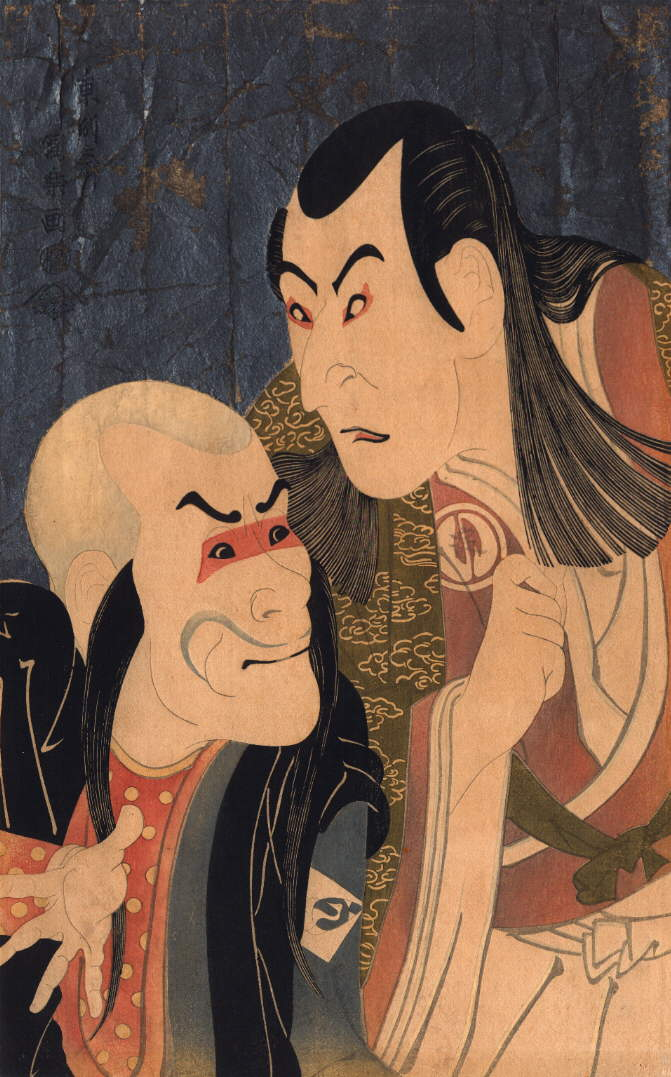
Sharaku; The Kabuki actors Bando Zenji (on the left, in the role of Benkei) and Sawamura Yodogoro II (on the right, as Yoshitsune), in the play Yoshitsune Senbon Zakura (Yoshitsune of the Thousand Cherry-Trees); 1794, fifth month.

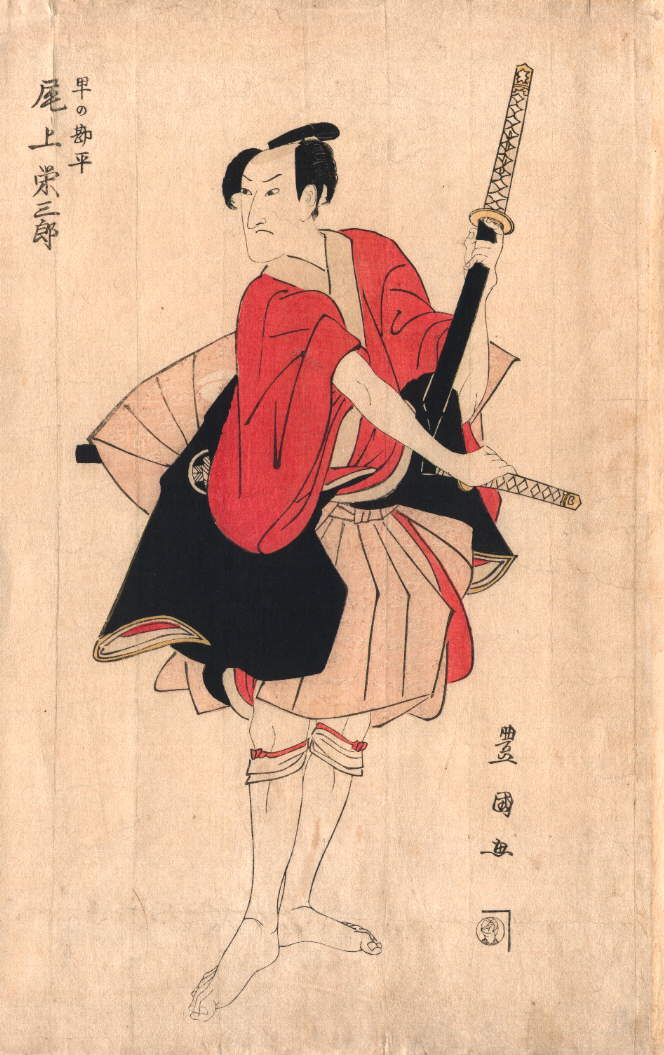
Utagawa Toyokuni; The Kabuki actor Onoe Eisaburo I; c. 1800

Yakusha-e (役者絵), often referred to as "actor prints" in English, are Japanese woodblock prints or, rarely, paintings, of kabuki actors, particularly those done in the ukiyo-e style popular through the Edo period (1603–1867) and into the beginnings of the 20th century. Most strictly, the term yakusha-e refers solely to portraits of individual artists (or sometimes pairs, as seen in this work by Sharaku). However, prints of kabuki scenes and of other elements of the world of the theater are very closely related, and were more often than not produced and sold alongside portraits.

Ukiyo-e images were almost exclusively images of urban life; the vast majority that were not landscapes were devoted to depicting courtesans, sumo, or kabuki.

Realistic detail, inscriptions, the availability of playbills from the period, and a number of other resources have allowed many prints to be analyzed and identified in great detail. Scholars have been able to identify the subjects of many prints down to not only the play, roles, and actors portrayed, but often the theater, year, month, and even day of the month.

== Development of the form ==
Over the course of the Edo period, as ukiyo-e as a whole developed and changed as a genre, yakusha-e went through a number of changes as well. Many prints, particularly earlier ones, depict actors generically, and very plainly, showing in a sense their true natures as actors merely playing at roles. Many other prints, meanwhile, take something of the opposite tack; they show kabuki actors and scenes very elaborately, intentionally obscuring the distinction between a play and the actual events it seeks to evoke.

Only a few artists were innovative enough to stand apart from the masses, creating works more distinctive in style. These artists, beginning with Katsukawa Shunshō, depicted actors elaborately and idealistically, but with the realistic details of individualized faces. Individual actors, such as Ichikawa Danjūrō V, can now be recognized across roles and even as depicted by different artists.

Torii Kiyonobu (1664–1729) was likely one of the first to produce actor prints in the mainstream ukiyo-e style. An artist from the Torii school which painted theater signboards, Kiyonobu was no stranger to the theater or to artistic depictions of it. In 1700, he published a book of full-length portraits of Edo kabuki actors in various roles. Though he took much, stylistically, from the Torii school style as a whole, there are significant elements of his style that were innovative and new. His dramatic forms would guide the core of ukiyo-e style for the next eighty years. It is possible that his prints may have even affected kabuki itself, as actors sought to match their performances to the dramatic, bombastic, and intense poses of the art.

Kiyonobu's innovative approach to actor portraiture is already visible in his 1693 series Kokon shibai iro kurabe hyakunin isshu, conceived as a beauty contest of one hundred actors of all ages, in which he depicted the performers in an exaggerated heroic style later described as hyōtan-ashi mimizu-gaki ("gourd-shaped legs, worm-like line drawing"). By 1700, with the ehon Fūryū ehon shihō byōbu, Kiyonobu had established the canon for depicting mie, the frozen, theatrical poses adopted by kabuki actors and held long enough to draw the applause of a discerning audience.

By the 1740s, artists such as Torii Kiyotada were making prints depicting not only the actors themselves, in portraits or in stage scenes, but the theaters themselves, including the audience, architecture, and various staging elements.

Throughout the 18th century, many ukiyo-e artists produced actor prints and other depictions of the kabuki world. Most of these drew strongly upon the Torii style, and were essentially promotional works, "generalized, highly stylized billboards meant to attract the crowd with their bold line and color". It was not until the 1760s and the emergence of Katsukawa Shunshō that actors began to be portrayed in such a way that the individual actors could be identified across different prints depicting different roles. Shunshō focused on facial features and idiosyncrasies of the individual actors.

This drastic change in style was emulated by Shunshō's students of the Katsukawa school, and by many other ukiyo-e artists of the period. The realistic, individualized style replaced that of the Torii school's idealistic, dramatic, but ultimately generalized style which had dominated for seventy years.

Sharaku is one of the most famous and influential yakusha-e printers along with Kiyonobu; working roughly a century after Kiyonobu, the two are often said to represent the beginnings and peak of kabuki depictions in prints. Sharaku's works are very bold and energetic, and demonstrate an unmistakably unique style. His portraits are easily among the most individualized and distinctive portrayals in all of ukiyo-e. However, his personal style was not emulated by other artists, and can be seen only in the works created by Sharaku himself, during the incredibly short period in which he produced prints, between 1794 and 1795.

Meanwhile, Utagawa Toyokuni emerged almost simultaneously with Sharaku. His most well-known actor prints were published in 1794–1796, in a collection called Yakusha butai no sugata-e (役者舞台の姿絵, "Views of Actors on Stage"). Though his works lack the unique energy of Sharaku's, he is considered one of the greatest artists in "large-head" portraits, and in ukiyo-e in general for his depictions of other subjects and in other formats. Though the figure print began to enter serious decline around the turn of the 19th century, headshot portraits continued to be produced. Artists of the Utagawa school, emulating Toyokuni's style, created highly characterized depictions of artists that, while not particularly realistic, were nevertheless highly individualized. The characters and, perhaps, actual appearances of a great number of individual actors, who would otherwise be known only by their names, are thus known to modern scholarship.

== A Later Development ==
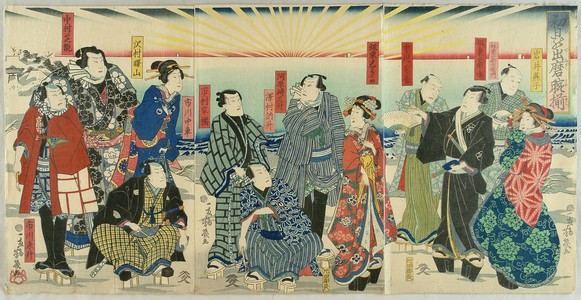

The sentiments of the above paragraph notwithstanding, there appeared a 開花年齢 [A Flowering Age] of 役者絵 (c.1860-75), when actors’ names could again be printed alongside their image, even if any scenic background was added by other artists (which was normally acknowledged), and, more importantly, date identifications were ascribed by means of single Censor Seal. There prints, of Kabuki virtuosi, were abundant, numbering more than the usual press runs, they included images of, for example: young 一 代目河原崎権十郎 [Kawarazaki Gonjuro I ]; the newly renamed 四代目中村芝 [Nakamura Shikan IV]; the aging 四代目市川小團 次 [Ichikawa Kodanji IV]; and the 15-year-old, virtuoso 女形 [onnagata; ladies’ roles] 三代目 沢村田之助 [Sawamara Tanosuke III]. This blossoming of 役者絵—they truly are portraits, not merely good caricatures—advertised plays in the season; new presentations of any said play, which could number many in a season, replete with new costumes (contemporary reports claimed that costumes only lasted some weeks in performance), or were presented gratis as souvenirs of any presentation. All were eagerly awaited by an insatiably acquisitive, theater-going public. See the description of the print here by clicking on the image.

== See also ==
- Bijin-ga – Ukiyo-e depictions of beautiful women
