= List of painters by name beginning with "T" =

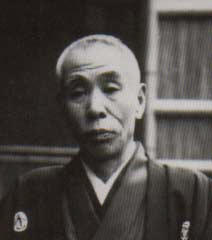
Takeuchi Seiho

Please add names of notable painters with a Wikipedia page, in precise English alphabetical order, using U.S. spelling conventions. Country and regional names refer to where painters worked for long periods, not to personal allegiances.

- Jean Tabaud (1914–1996), French portrait painter and war artist
- Enrique Tábara (1930–2021), Ecuadorian painter and teacher
- Augustus Vincent Tack (1870–1949), American painter
- Tadanori Yokoo (横尾忠則, born 1936), Japanese graphic designer, print-maker and painter
- Sophie Taeuber-Arp (1889–1943), Swiss painter, sculptor and interior designer
- Hiroyuki Tajima (田嶋宏行, 1911–1984), Japanese print-maker
- Judy Takács (born 1962), American painter
- Hiromitsu Takahashi (高橋宏光, born 1959), Japanese artist and stencil print-maker
- Takahashi Yuichi (高橋由一, 1828–1894), Japanese painter
- Takehisa Yumeji (竹久夢二, 1884–1934), Japanese painter and poet
- Takeuchi Seihō (竹内栖鳳, 1864–1942), Japanese nihonga painter
- Allen Butler Talcott (1867–1908), American painter
- Algernon Talmage (1871–1939), English painter
- Reuben Tam (1916–1991), American painter, educator and poet
- Rufino Tamayo (1899–1991), Mexican painter
- Tanaka Isson (田中一村, 1908–1977), Japanese nihonga painter
- Tang Di (唐棣, 1287–1355), Chinese painter
- Tang Yifen (湯貽汾, 1778–1853), Chinese painter and calligrapher
- Tang Yin (唐寅, 1470–1524), Chinese painter, calligrapher and poet
- Josefina Tanganelli Plana (1904–1966), Spanish painter
- Yves Tanguy (1900–1955), French painter
- Tani Bunchō (1763–1840), Japanese painter and poet
- Henry O. Tanner (1859–1937), early African-American artist
- Dorothea Tanning (1910–2012), American painter, sculptor and writer
- Tanomura Chikuden (1777–1835), Japanese painter
- Tan Ting-pho (1895–1947), Taiwanese oil painter
- Michel Tapié (1909–1987), French art critic and theorist
- Antoni Tàpies (1923–2012), Spanish Catalan painter
- Caterina Tarabotti (active 1659), Italian painter
- Edmund Charles Tarbell (1862–1938), American painter
- Alain Tasso, poet, painter and critic
- Vladimir Tatlin (1885–1953), Russian painter and architect
- Jules Tavernier (1844–1889), French painter and illustrator
- Tawaraya Sōtatsu (俵屋宗達, c. 1570–1643), Japanese painter and designer
- Alasdair Grant Taylor (1934–2007), Scottish painter, draftsman and sculptor
- Daniel Taylor (born 1955), Canadian painter
- Eric Taylor (1909–1999), English artist
- Persis Goodale Thurston Taylor (1821–1906), American/Hawaiian painter and sketch artist
- Shirley Teed (1933–2018), English painter
- Afewerk Tekle (1932–2012), Ethiopian painter and stained-glass designer
- Abraham van den Tempel (1622–1672), Dutch painter
- Carpoforo Tencalla (1623–1685), Swiss/Italian painter and frescoist
- Jan Tengnagel (1584–1635), Dutch draftsman and painter
- David Teniers the Elder (1582–1649), Flemish painter
- David Teniers the Younger (1610–1690), Flemish/Dutch painter, print-maker and copyist
- David Teniers III (1638–1685), Flemish painter
- Jason Teraoka (born 1964), American painter
- Hendrick Terbrugghen (1588–1629), Dutch painter
- Pietro Testa (1617–1650), Italian artist, print-maker and draftsman
- Wlodzimierz Tetmajer (1861–1923), Polish painter
- Mór Than (1828–1899), Hungarian painter
- Frits Thaulow (1847–1906), Norwegian painter
- Abbott Handerson Thayer (1849–1921), American artist, naturalist and teacher
- Theophanes the Greek (1340–1410), Byzantine artist and icon painter
- Jan Theuninck (born 1954), Belgian painter and poet
- Wayne Thiebaud (1920–2021), American painter
- Alma Thomas (1894–1978), American painter and art educator
- Brian Thomas (1912–1980), English church painter
- Robert Thomas (1926–1999), Welsh sculptor
- André Thomkins (1930–1985), Swiss/German painter, illustrator and poet
- Bob Thompson (1937–1966), American painter
- Ernest Heber Thompson (1891–1971), New Zealand painter and print-maker
- Ernst Thoms (1896–1983), German painter
- Adam Bruce Thomson (1885–1976), Scottish painter and educator
- Charles Thomson (born 1953), English painter, poet and photographer
- John Thomson of Duddingston (1778–1840), Scottish painter and Church of Scotland minister
- Tom Thomson (1877–1917), Canadian artist
- William John Thomson (1771–1845), English painter and miniaturist
- William Thon (1906–2000), American painter
- Jens Jørgen Thorsen (1932–2000), Danish artist
- Ernő Tibor (1885–1945), Hungarian painter and Holocaust victim
- Adolph Tidemann (1814–1876), Norwegian painter
- Giovanni Battista Tiepolo (1696–1770), Venetian painter and print-maker
- Louis Comfort Tiffany (1848–1933), American artist and designer
- Lajos Tihanyi (1885–1938), Hungarian painter and lithographer
- Walasse Ting (1929–2010), Chinese/American painter
- Tintoretto (1518–1594), Italian painter
- James Tissot (1836–1902), French painter
- Titian (1488–1576), Italian painter
- Ettore Tito (1859–1941), Italian painter
- Alton Tobey (1914–2005), American painter, muralist and art teacher
- Mark Tobey (1890–1976), American painter
- A. R. Middleton Todd (1891–1966), English artist
- Giuseppe Tominz (1790–1866), Austro-Hungarian (Slovenian)/Italian painter
- Tomioka Tessai (富岡鉄斎, 1837–1924), painter and calligrapher
- Bradley Walker Tomlin (1899–1955), American artist
- Hannah Tompkins (1920–1995) American painter and print-maker
- Gentile Tondino (1923–2001), Canadian artist and educator
- Stanisław Tondos (1854–1917), Austro-Hungarian (Polish) painter
- Henry Tonks (1862–1937), English draftsman, painter and surgeon
- Jacob Toorenvliet (1640–1719), Dutch painter
- Rodolphe Töpffer (1799–1847), Swiss painter, caricaturist and teacher
- Torii Kiyomasu (鳥居清倍, fl. 1690s – 1720s), Japanese ukiyo-e painter and print-maker
- Torii Kiyomasu II (鳥居清倍, c. 1720–1750), Japanese ukiyo-e painter and woodblock print-maker
- Torii Kiyomitsu (鳥居清満, 1735–1785), Japanese ukiyo-e painter and print-maker
- Torii Kiyomoto (鳥居清元, 1645–1702), Japanese ukiyo-e painter and kabuki actor
- Torii Kiyonaga (勝川春潮, 1752–1815), Japanese ukiyo-e artist
- Torii Kiyonobu I (鳥居清信, 1664–1729), Japanese ukiyo-e painter and print-maker
- Toriyama Sekien (鳥山石燕, 1712–1788), Japanese ukiyo-e artist and scholar
- Þórarinn B. Þorláksson (1867–1924), Icelandic painter
- Veikko Törmänen (born 1945), Finnish painter and graphic artist
- János Tornyai (1869–1936), Hungarian painter
- Joaquín Torres García (1874–1949), Uruguayan painter
- Tosa Mitsunobu (土佐光信, 1434–1525), Japanese painter
- Tosa Mitsuoki (土佐光起, 1617–1691), Japanese painter
- Henri de Toulouse-Lautrec (1864–1901), French painter, print-maker and illustrator
- Pierre Toutain-Dorbec (born 1951), French/American photographer, artist and author
- Toyen (1902–1980), Czech painter, draftsman and illustrator
- Toyohara Chikanobu (豊原周延, 1838–1912) Japanese woodblock artist
- Toyohara Kunichika (豊原国周, 1835–1900) Japanese woodblock artist
- Friedrich Traffelet (1897–1954), Swiss painter and illustrator
- Kurt Trampedach (born 1943), Danish painter
- Bill Traylor (1854–1947), American artist
- Henric Trenk (1818–1892), Swiss/Romanian painter and graphic artist
- Vladimir Tretchikoff (1913–2006), Russian artist
- Carlos Trillo Name, Cuban painter
- J. W. Tristram (1870–1938), Australian watercolor artist
- Vasily Andreevich Tropinin (1776–1857), Russian Romantic painter
- Clovis Trouille (1889–1975), French painter and decorator
- Jean-François de Troy (1679–1752), French painter and tapestry designer
- Wilhelm Trübner (1851–1917), German painter
- John Trumbull (1756–1843), American artist during the American Revolutionary War
- Ivan Trush (1869–1941), Russian (Ukrainian)/Soviet painter and critic
- Tsuchida Bakusen (土田麦僊, 1887–1936) Japanese painter
- Tsuji Kakō (都路華香, 1870–1931), Japanese painter
- Tsukioka Yoshitoshi (月岡芳年, 1839–1892), Japanese artist
- Israel Tsvaygenbaum (born 1961), Russian/American artist
- Werner Tübke (1929–2004), German painter
- Tony Tuckson (1921–1973), Australian artist
- Thomas Tudor (1785–1855), Welsh artist and land agent
- Henry Scott Tuke (1858–1929), English artist
- Mym Tuma (born 1940), American artist
- Bernt Tunold (1877–1946), Norwegian painter
- John Doman Turner (1873–1938), English painter
- J. M. W. Turner 1775–1850), English painter and print-maker (historically known as William Turner)
- William Turner of Oxford (1789–1862), English landscape painter
- Glennray Tutor (born 1950), American painter
- Laurits Tuxen (1853–1927), Danish painter and sculptor
- Luc Tuymans (born 1958), Belgian contemporary artist
- John Henry Twachtman (1853–1902), American painter
- Stanley Twardowicz (1917–2008), American painter and photographer
- William Twigg-Smith (1883–1950), New Zealand/American painter, illustrator and musician
- Cy Twombly (1928–2011), American artist
- Dwight William Tryon (1849–1925), American painter
- Ralph Burke Tyree (1921–1979), American painter
