= Béatrice-von-Wattenwyl-Haus =

Town mansion in Bern, Switzerland

Coordinates: 46°56′51″N 7°27′10″E

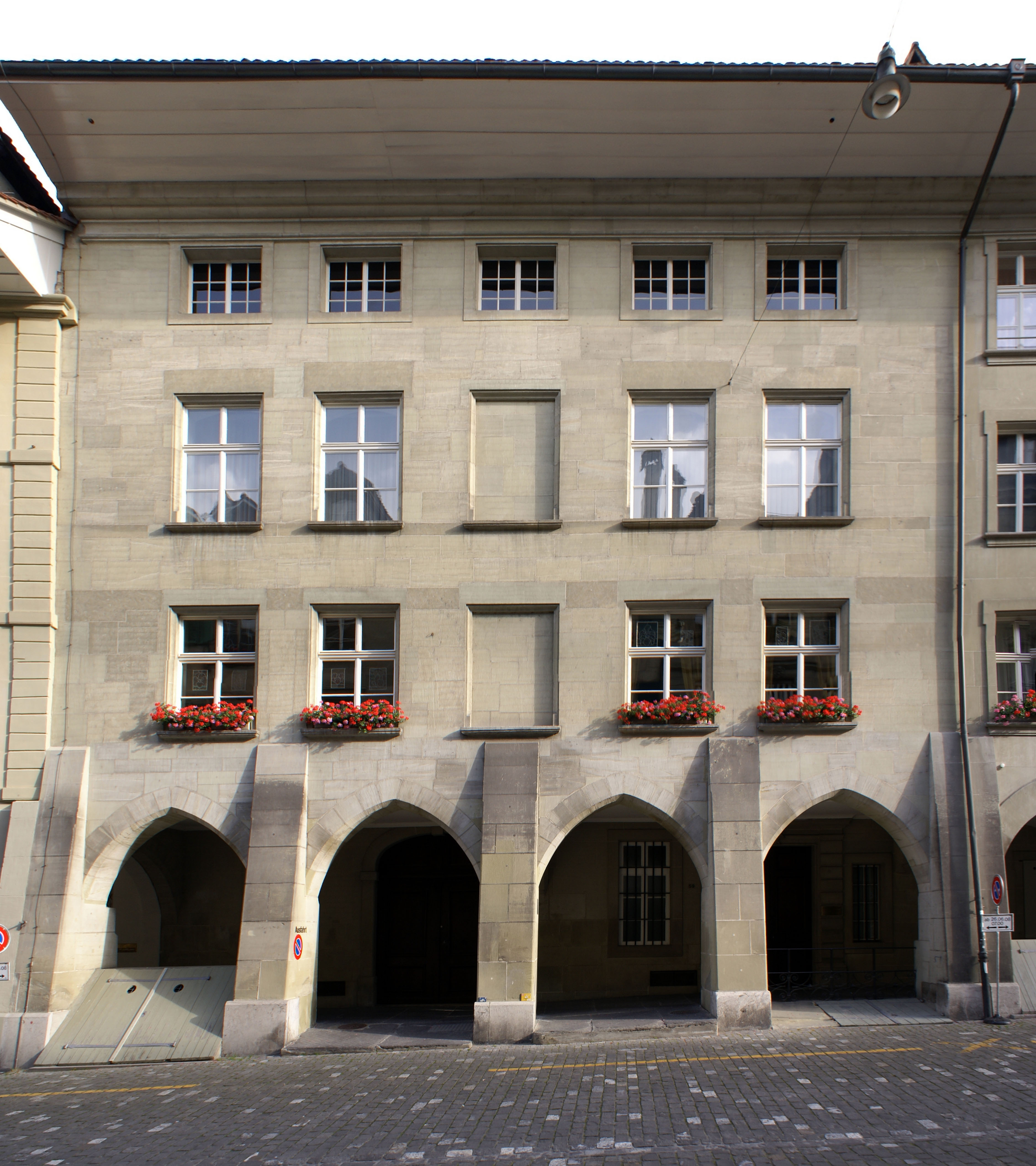
The main entrance of the Béatrice-von-Wattenwyl-Haus (north façade)

The Béatrice-von-Wattenwyl-Haus (also known as the Frisching-Haus) is a town mansion on the Junkerngasse No. 59 in the Old City of Bern, only a few steps away from the Erlacherhof.

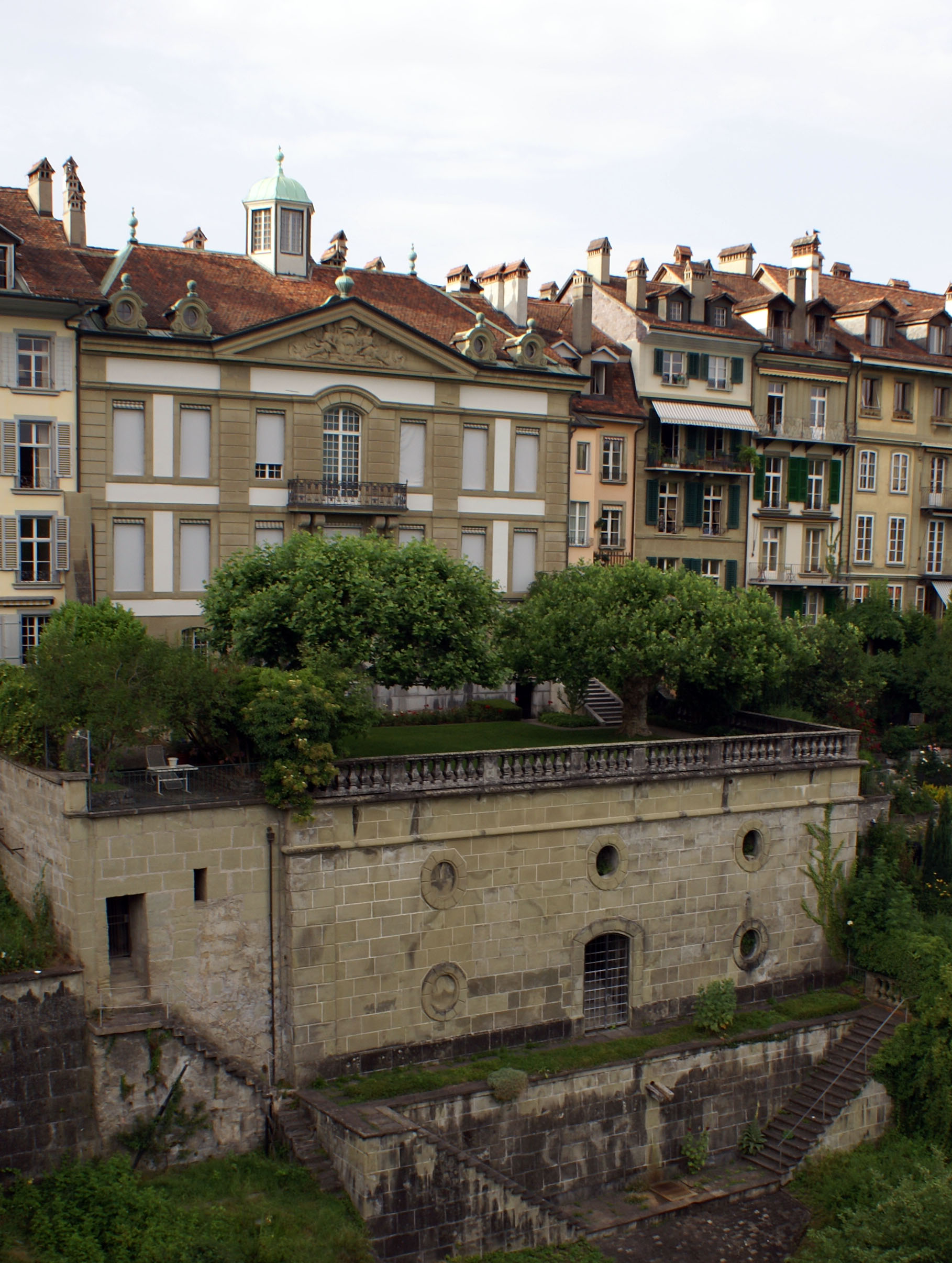
The riverside terrace of the Béatrice-von-Wattenwyl-Haus (south façade)

The mansion is built up of several medieval houses. This is still visible on the north façade (main entrance) which consists of 3 medieval houses.

Between 1695 and 1710 on the order of its owner, the Bernese patrician Samuel Frisching (II), an ancestor of Franz Rudolf Frisching, the mansion underwent a rebuilt by the architect Joseph Abeille. Abeille restructured the interior of the mansion and added the elegant south façade in the Louis XIV style.

In 1838 the mansion passed through marriage into the von Wattenwyl family. The last private owners of the mansion, the Bernese patricians Béatrice and Jakob Emanuel von Wattenwyl, had no children and bequeathed the mansion to the Swiss Confederation in 1929. When Jakob Emanuel von Wattenwyl, who survived his wife, died in 1934, the gift took effect. The mansion is still equipped with the original furniture mainly from the 18th and 19th century as well as many portrait paintings representing members of the Frisching and the von Wattenwyl families. To the mansion belongs the largest terraced garden of any privately built residences in the Old City of Bern.

Nowadays, the mansion is used as the official town residence for ceremonial events by the Swiss Federal Council. The so-called von Wattenwyl talks exist since 1970, and are a regular forum to exchange opinions between the Federal Council and the heads of those parties that are represented in the Federal Council.

The mansion is open to the public 4 times a year, every first Saturday in January, April, July and October.

== Literature ==
- Monica Bilfinger und Martin Fröhlich: Schweizerische Kunstführer GSK, Band 681: Das Beatrice von Wattenwil-Haus in Bern, Bern 2000, ISBN 3-85782-681-9
