= Junkerngasse =

Street in Bern, Switzerland

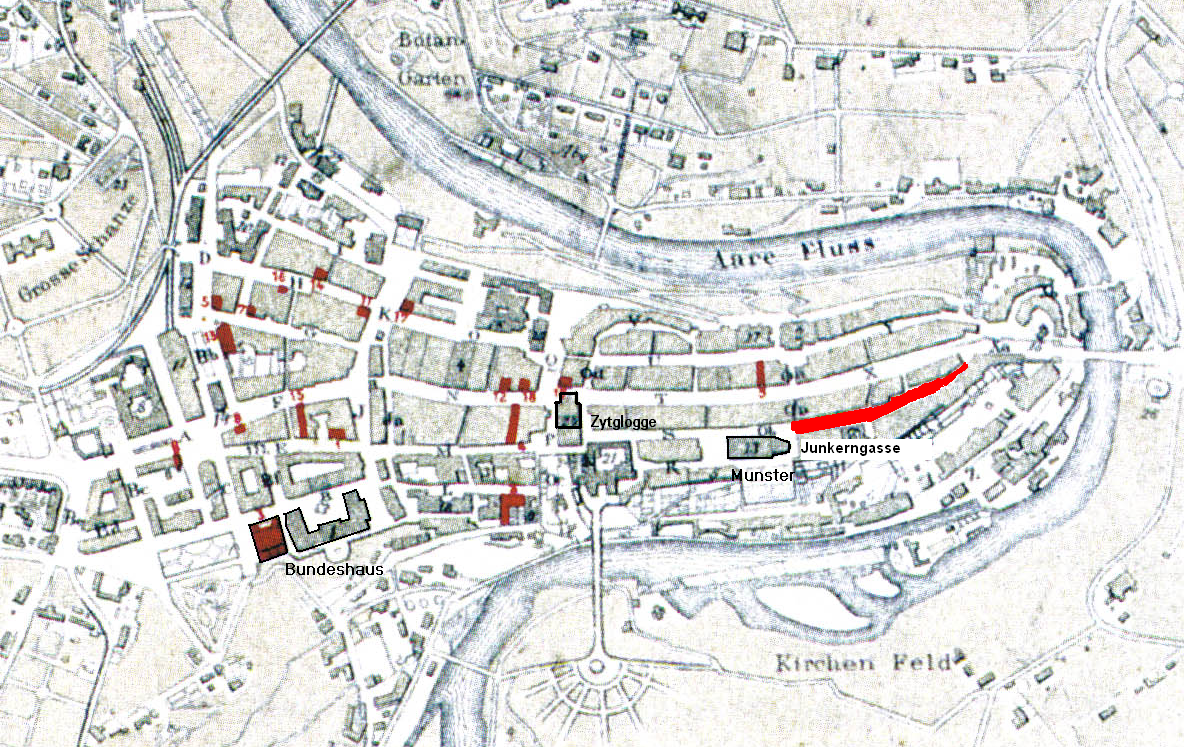
- Old City of Bern with Junkerngasse highlighted
- Former name(s): Kirchgasse; Edle Gasse
- Length: 300 m (980 ft)
- Location: Old City of Bern, Bern, Switzerland
- Postal code: 3011
- Coordinates: 46.9479°N 7.4543°E

Construction
- Construction start: 1191

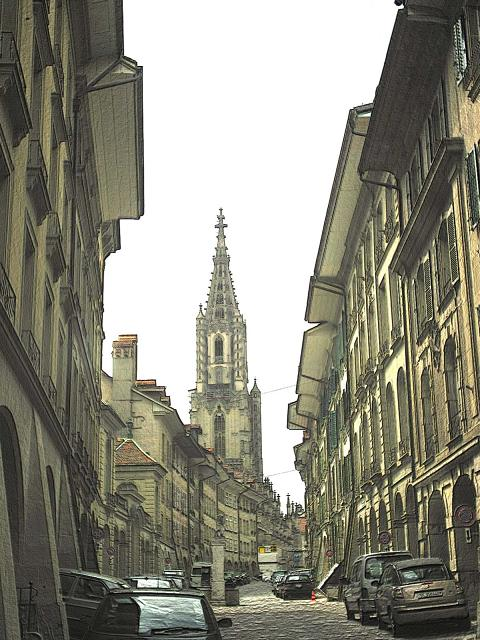
The Junkerngasse, looking north towards the Münster.

The Junkerngasse ("Nobility Lane") is a street in the Old City of Bern, the medieval city center of Bern, Switzerland. It connects the tip of the Aar peninsula (the Nydegg neighbourhood) to the Münster.

The Junkerngasse is the Old City's best-preserved street. The riverfront of its palatial houses with their late Baroque façades and extensive garden terraces has been described in an art history guidebook as "one of Europe's most magnificent cityscapes".

== Topography ==
The Junkerngasse connects to the generally parallel Gerechtigkeitsgasse and to the Nydegggasse in the east, and continues as the Münstergasse to the west. It is connected to the Gerechtigkeitsgasse by small alleyways leading north (Oberes and Unteres Gerechtigkeitsgässchen). The Bubenbergrain descends through the Bubenbergtor, a former city gate, towards the river Aare in the south.

== History ==
The street was called Kirchgasse ("Church Lane") up until the 16th century, and was renamed from Edle Gasse ("Noble Lane") to Junkerngasse in the 17th century. The latter names reflect the street's character as a residential area almost exclusively used by Bern's leading patrician families. Only a few houses (nos. 7–15) were originally craftsmen's houses.

The street's current topography reflects about the state of 1470. The earlier records are fragmentary, but at some time between 1430 and 1468 the city's earliest town hall was demolished at the Junkerngasse's the western end. Since then, the general structure of the street has remained unchanged. The pavement was replaced in 1998.

== Buildings ==
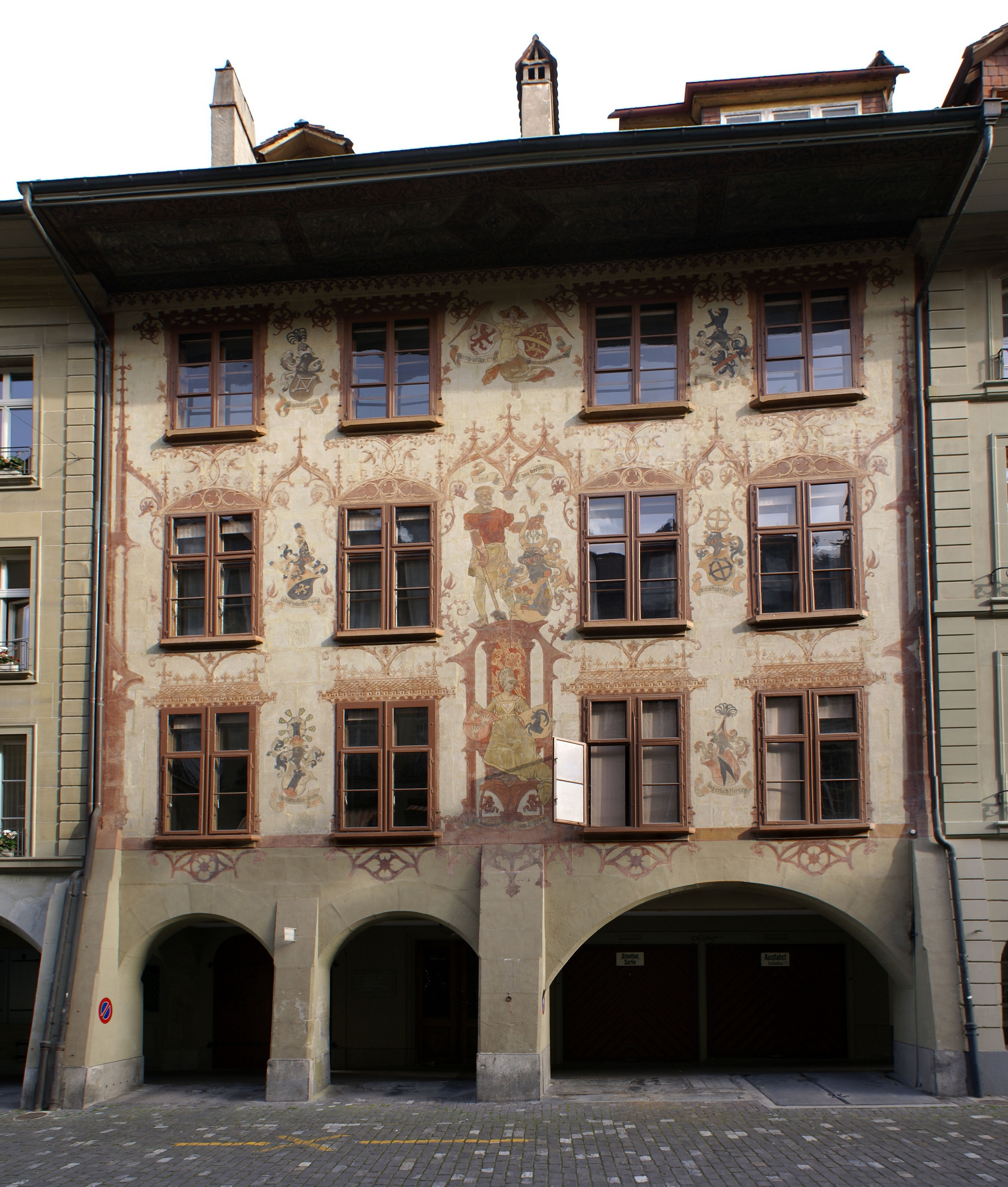
No. 51, the Zeerlederhaus.

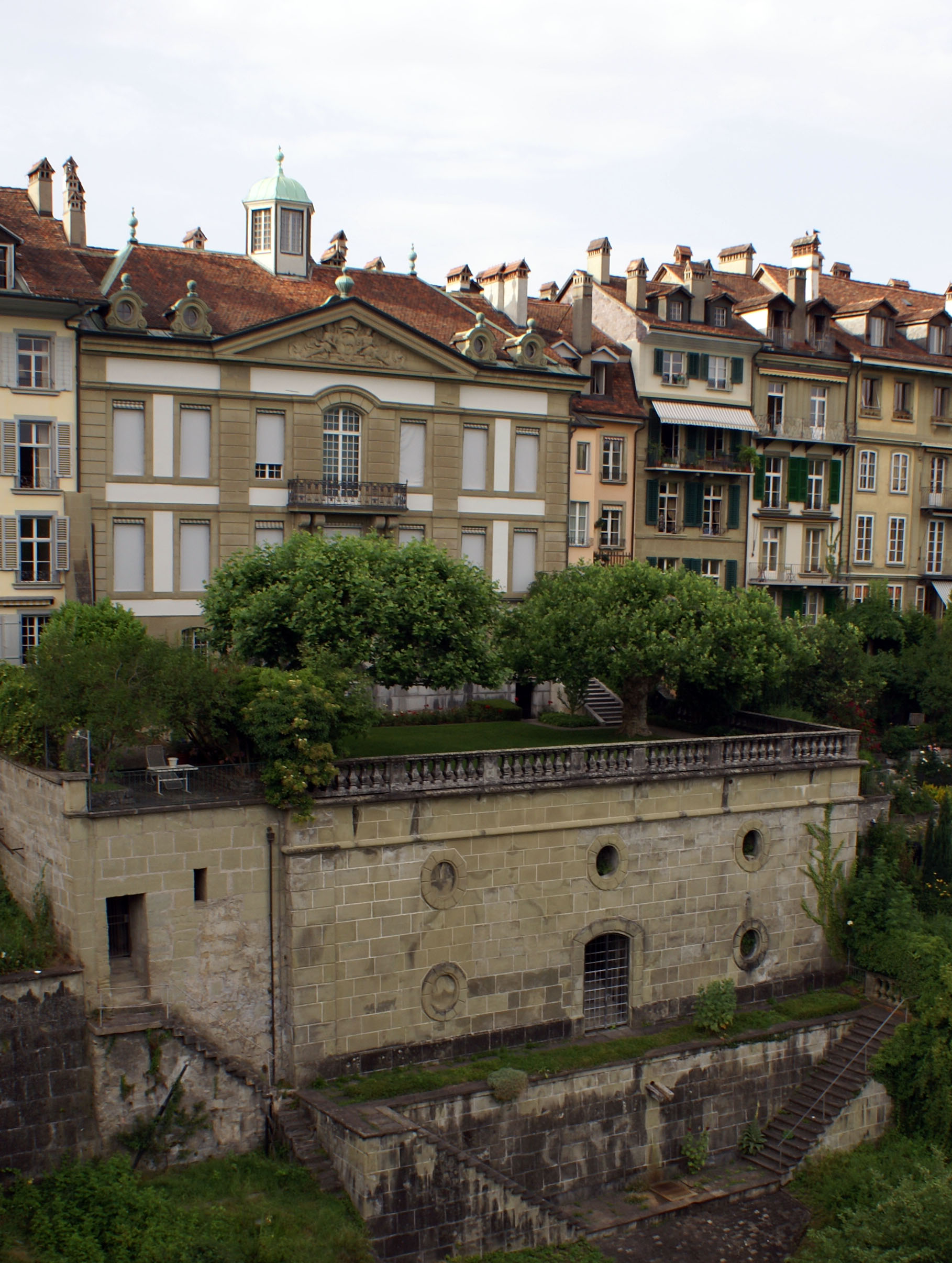
The riverside terrace of the Béatrice-von-Wattenwyl-Haus.

The street's only fountain is the Junkerngassbrunnen, a plain Stockbrunnen adorned with a 17th-century figure of a lion bearing a lance and the Bubenberg arms. No. 9 is the best-preserved of the Junkerngasse's Late Gothic craftsmen's houses. No. 21, the von Scharnachthal house, is one of Berne's most elegant Early Baroque works by Friedrich May. The four-story street façade of no. 31 (1700–20) links Late Renaissance elements with the structure characteristic of the Bernese Late Baroque. The interior of No. 39 displays the skills of 18th-century Bernese craftsmen in transforming medieval townhouses into comfortable residences; the courtyard is particularly noted for its Baroque elegance. No. 43 (1784–86) is exemplary for Bernese architecture at the threshold between Late Baroque and Classicism. No. 22 was the workshop of painter Friedrich Traffelet (1897–1954); it features a humorous façade painting of 1913. No. 22, the Morlot-Haus by Albrecht Türler, is the most ambitious building in the northern part of the street.

The Erlacherhof ("Erlach Court"), no. 47, is the most significant private building, in historical and architectural terms, of the Old City. Built 1747–52 by Türler for Hieronymus von Erlach, it is the only application of Jacques-François Blondel's concept of palace entre cour et jardin – a palace between court and garden – in an urban setting. As the city's greatest urban palace, the Erlacherhof served as General Guillaume Brune's headquarters in 1798, as the seat of the French Embassy to Switzerland until 1832, and as the first seat of the Swiss Federal Council and the federal administration from 1848 to 1857. It has since been used as the seat of the government of the city of Bern. Part of its outer wall is the Bubenbergtor, a 12th-century city gate and the oldest building in Bern that is still standing. The house opposite the Erlacherhof on Junkerngasse No. 38 belonged to the legendary Bond Girl Ursula Andress.

The Zeerlederhaus, no. 51, is noted for the 1897 painting by Rudolf Münger on its late Gothic façade. No. 59, the Béatrice-von-Wattenwyl-Haus, has been described as a concentrate of Bernese architectural history; it has not been significantly altered since its 18th-century reshaping by Joseph Abeille. In the ownership of the Swiss Confederation since 1934, it is now used for ceremonial events by the Federal Council.

== Bibliography ==
- Caviezel, Zita; Herzog, Georges; Keller, Jürg A. (2006), Basel-Landschaft, Basel-Stadt, Bern, Solothurn, Kunstführer durch die Schweiz, vol. 3 (1st ed.), Bern: Gesellschaft für Schweizerische Kunstgeschichte, pp. 170–79, ISBN 3-906131-97-1
- Hofer, Paul (1959), Die Stadt Bern. Gesellschaftshäuser und Wohnbauten, Kunstdenkmäler des Kantons Bern, vol. 2, Basel: Gesellschaft für Schweizerische Kunstgeschichte / Verlag Birkhäuser, pp. 116–225, ISBN 3-906131-13-0, archived from the original on 4 March 2016
