= Samuel Frisching (II) =

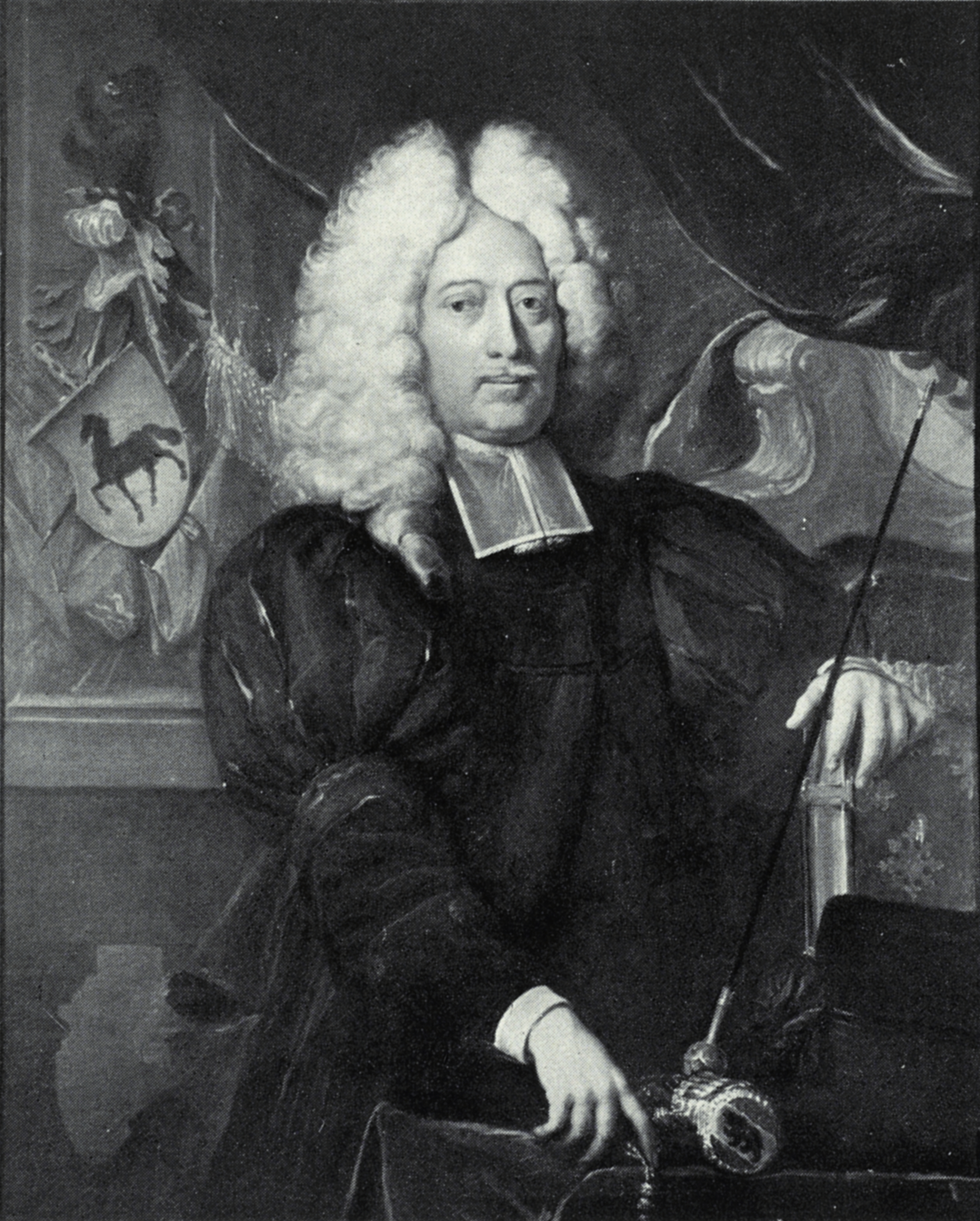
- Samuel Frisching (1638–1721) painted by Johann Rudolf Huber
- Born: 27 June 1638; Trachselwald, Switzerland
- Died: 23 October 1721 (aged 83); Rümligen, Switzerland
- Spouse: Magdalena von Weiss (m. 1647)
- Parent(s): Samuel Frisching (1605-1683); Susanne Lombach

Samuel Frisching (27 June 1638 – 23 October 1721) was a Swiss soldier and politician from Bern. Between 1715 and 1721 he served as that city's Schultheiss, a position not totally dissimilar from that of a modern city mayor.

== Life ==
His parents' fourth son, Samuel Frisching came from a leading Bernese family. His father, also called Samuel Frisching, was a chief magistrate and himself the city's Schultheiss between 1668 and 1682.

The younger Samuel Frisching completed his schooling in Bern and then went on to study at the Academy of Geneva between 1656 and 1657. It was while he was in Geneva that, in 1658, the twenty year old joined the Swiss Guards of the King of France in defiance of his father's wishes.

While serving in the French army, Frisching was seriously wounded in battle at Gravelines during the Franco-Spanish War, narrowly avoiding being buried by a mine explosion. This was followed by an extended educational tour through England, Scotland, the Netherlands and Germany, after which he returned to Bern: in compliance with the family's wishes he now embarked on a career of service to his city.

He became a member of Bern's Great Council in 1664, progressing to membership of the Inner Council in 1685. In this capacity, he was entrusted with a succession of quasi-ambassadorial missions. In the meantime he had already served, in 1670, as Schultheiss in Burgdorf, a small town of qualified autonomy to which Bern had been entitled to appoint the Schultheiss since 1384. In 1715, he was appointed Schultheiss of Bern.

In parallel with his service in civic administration, Frisching also continued with his military career where opportunities arose. In 1712, by now aged 74 he was the General who took command of the Protestant confederate army in the Second War of Villmergen after the army commander Nicolas de Diesbach and his lieutenant Jean de Sacconay had both been badly wounded at Villmergen. Frisching is credited with having turned an impending rout into a victory on 25 July 1712.

== Built legacy ==
Between 1705 and 1706, Frisching greatly extended his family home in the city's Junkerngasse, using plans supplied by the engineer-architect Joseph Abeille. The resulting "urban palace" is now known as the Béatrice-von-Wattenwyl-Haus, an impressive south facing city mansion, sometimes used in the present for civic functions.

A statue of Samuel Frisching is the fourth of the eight adorning the front upper level exterior of the Cantonal Bank main building in Bern.

== Family ==
One of the sons of Samuel Frisching was Johann Frisching, a Swiss military officer and magistrate who married Susanna Margaretha Stürler of the Wattenwyl dynasty. Johann himself was a member of the Bern Great Council in 1701, and of the Inner Council in 1721.

A grandson, Rudolf Emanuel Frisching (1698–1780), was also an officer and a magistrate.
