= MYM =

MYM may refer to:

- Mym Tuma, an American artist also known as Marilynn Tuma
- MeetYourMakers, an esports organisation based in Sweden
- Mujahideen Youth Movement, a jihadist group better known as al-Shabaab
- MyM, a British entertainment magazine
