= Treaty of Baden (1714) =

1714 treaty between France and the Holy Roman Empire

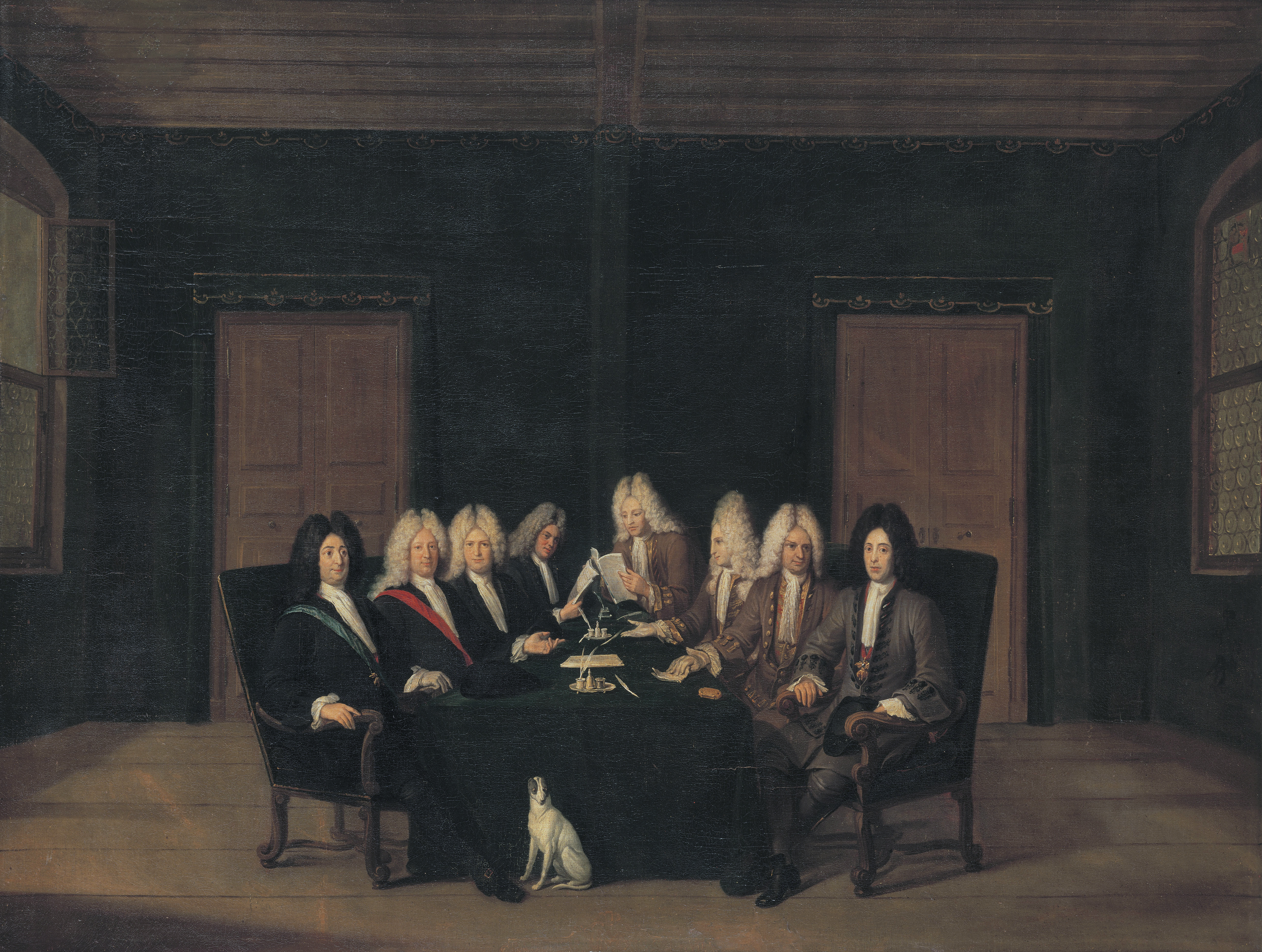
- The emissaries of the peace congress of Baden on 7 September 1714; Marshall Villars on the far left, Prince Eugene on the far right, by Johann Rudolf Huber, oil on canvas, 1714.
- Context: End of the War of the Spanish Succession
- Signed: 7 September 1714
- Location: (Old Swiss Confederacy) Baden
- Negotiators: (Kingdom of France) Duke of Villars; (Kingdom of France) Comte de Luc; (Kingdom of France) de Saint-Contest; (Holy Roman Empire) Prince Eugene of Savoy; (Holy Roman Empire) Peter, Count of Goëss; (Holy Roman Empire) John Frederick, Count Seilern
- Parties: France; Holy Roman Empire
- Language: French

The Treaty of Baden, signed 7 September 1714 in Baden, Switzerland, made peace between France and the Holy Roman Empire. Together with the Treaties of Utrecht and Rastatt, it was one in a series of agreements ending the 1701 to 1713 War of the Spanish Succession.

== Background ==
The treaty was the first international agreement signed in the Swiss Confederacy. On the margins of the conference, the signatories also secretly agreed to a Catholic union to intervene in favour of the Catholic cantons that had been defeated at the Second War of Villmergen two years earlier by the Peace of Aarau ending Catholic hegemony in the Confederacy.

== Terms ==
- France retained Alsace and Landau but returned the east bank of the Rhine River (the Breisgau) to Austria.
- The prince-electors of Bavaria and Cologne were reinstated in their territories and their positions.
- Emperor Charles VI kept the title of King of Spain and the Spanish heritage, which was actually of no value since in Spain, all power remained with King Philip V of Spain.
