= Johann Rudolf Huber =

Swiss painter (1668–1748)

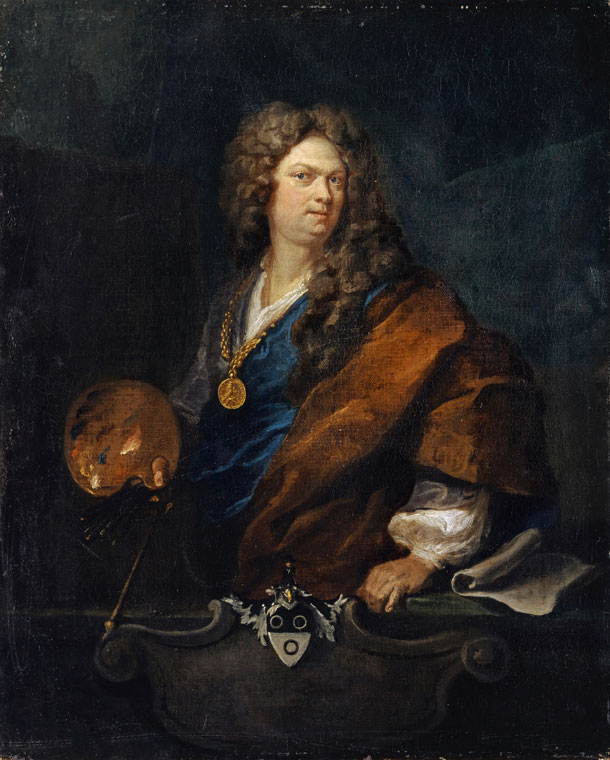
Self-portrait (1710)

Johann Rudolf Huber (21 April 1668 – 28 February 1748) was a Swiss portrait painter. Among his famous subjects were Charles III William, Margrave of Baden-Durlach, Joseph I, Holy Roman Emperor and Albrecht von Haller.

== Biography ==
Huber was born on 21 April 1668 in Basel, canton of Basel, Switzerland. He was the son of Alexander Huber, an innkeeper and member of the Grand Council of Basel. As a child, Huber received drawing lessons from a member of the Wannenwetsch family of glass painters (likely Hans Jörg Wannenwetsch II). In 1682, aged 14, he began an apprenticeship with the portraitist Hans Kaspar Meyer, later continuing his education from 1684 to 1687 at Joseph Werner's private academy in Bern. In his free time, Huber painted portraits of craftsmen for little money and discovered his particular passion for portraiture. He later boasted of having executed over 5,000 such works; from 1683 to 1718, he catalogued each completed work in his Register der Contrafeit, so Ich nach dem Leben gemahldt habe (now at the Kunstmuseum Winterthur).

On his journey home to Basel, Huber stayed at the Prince-Bishop of Basel's residences in Moutier, Delémont, and Arlesheim, where he received portrait commissions. On Werner's advice, he travelled to Italy in 1687. According to Johann Kaspar Füssli (1769), Huber attended an academy in Venice for some time. The decisive period of his artistic training, however, was his three-year apprenticeship in Haarlem under landscape and marine painter Pieter Mulier the Younger, who at that time worked alternately in Venice and Milan. Huber added figures to Mulier's landscapes. He then traveled via Florence to Rome, where he gained access to Carlo Maratta and the Accademia di San Luca. His return journey took him first to Lyon and then to Paris.

In 1693, Huber returned to Basel and married Catharina Faesch (1671–1719), the daughter of a city councillor. A son, Alexander, also became a painter but died at a young age. Their daughter, Anna Katharina, married the painter Johann Ulrich Schellenberg, who worked in Huber's studio, in 1737. In 1694, Huber entered the Grand Council of Basel and began working for Frederick VII, Margrave of Baden-Durlach, who was living in exile in Basel. Through the Margrave's mediation, he was commissioned as court painter to Eberhard Louis, Duke of Württemberg at the Old Castle in Stuttgart, where he created extensive ceiling and wall paintings from 1697 to 1699 (largely destroyed by a fire in 1931). Around the turn of the century, Huber was again working in Basel, primarily as a portraitist in the service of the Margrave of Baden-Durlach. He also oversaw the decoration of the Margrave's new castle in Basel and in 1701 was appointed building inspector of the upper part of the Margraviate of Baden-Durlach, which had been devastated during the Nine Years' War.

As he lacked the necessary recognition in his native Basel, from 1702 to 1738 Huber lived primarily in Bern, where there was a high demand for his portraits. Besides approximately 400 depictions of members of Bernese society and several official portraits of mayors (Schultheißen), Huber also created designs and paintings such as title pages, heraldry, city seals and clocks. Several working trips took him to Basel every winter, and he also spent time in Neuchâtel, Baden, Solothurn, and southern Germany. In 1738, Huber returned to Basel, and in 1740, he became a member of the city's Small Council. He remained active as an artist until 1746. Huber died on 28 February 1748 in Basel, aged 79.

== Gallery ==
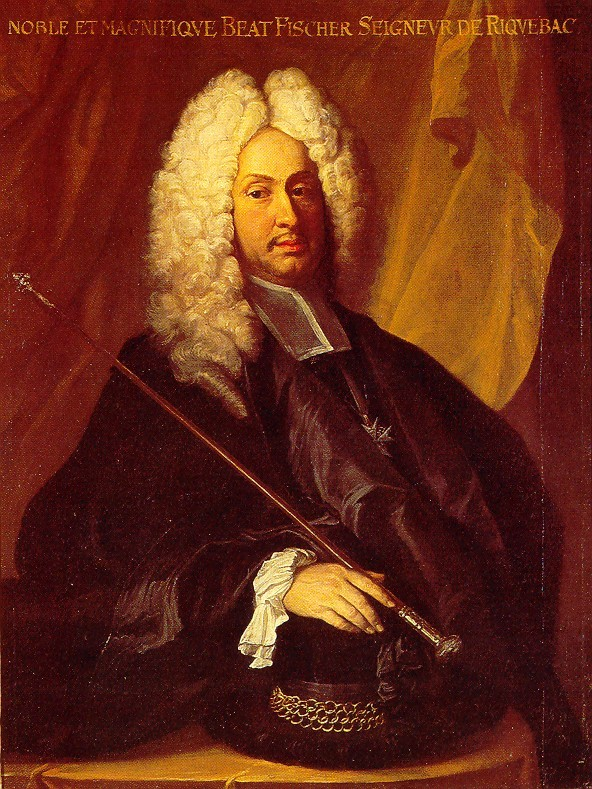
Beat Fischer (1697)

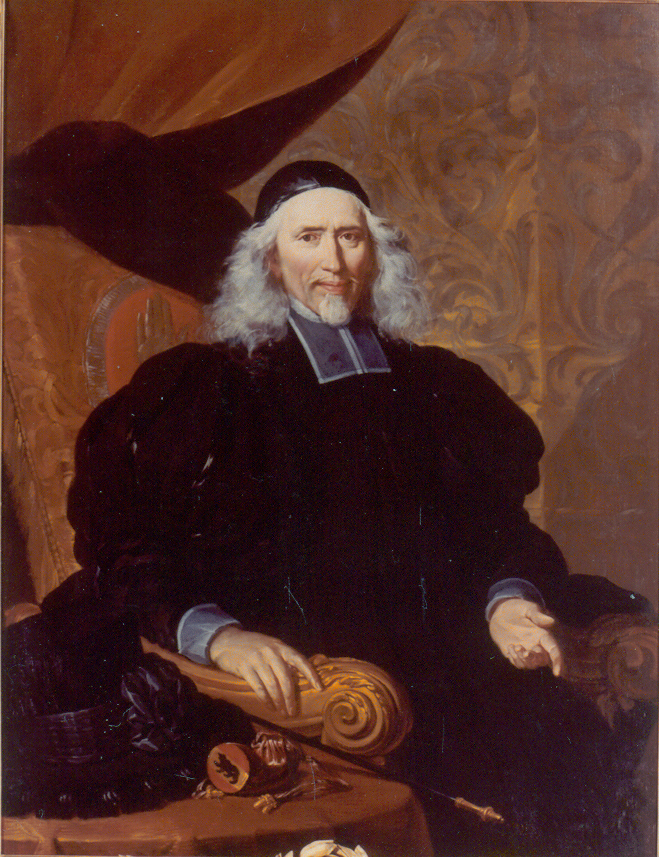
Johann Rudolf Sinner (1704)

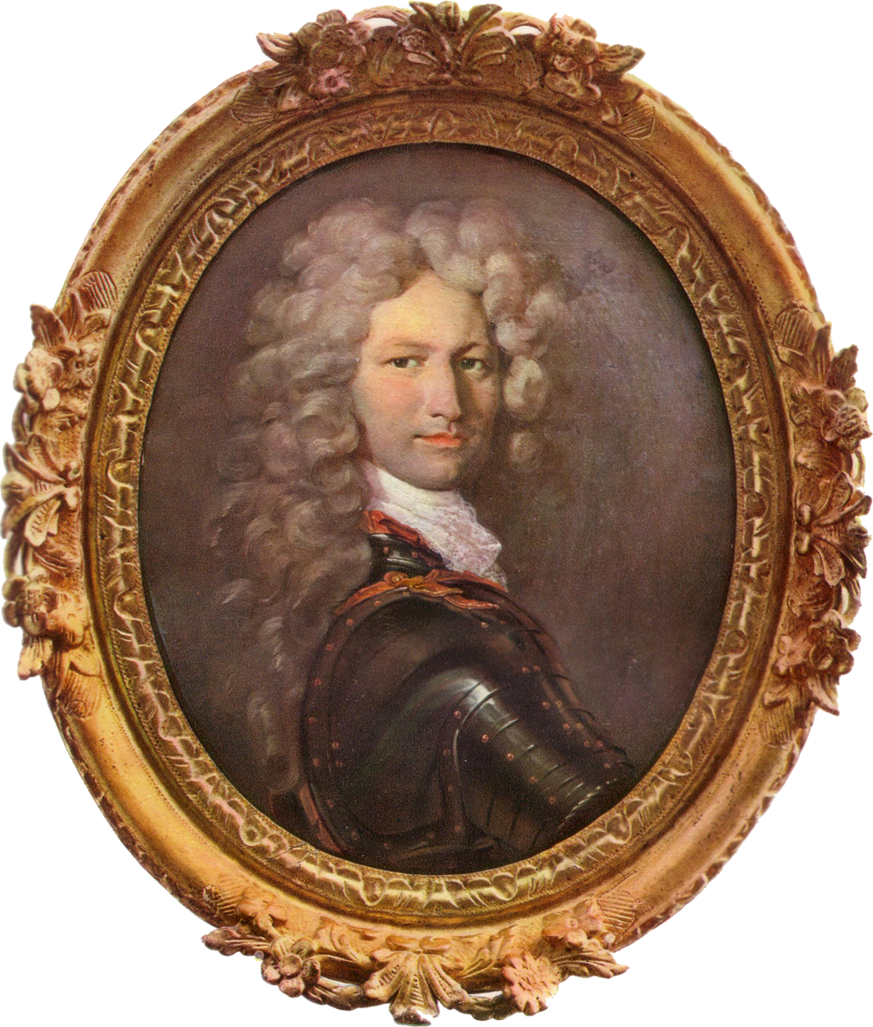
François-Louis de Pêmes de St.Saphorin

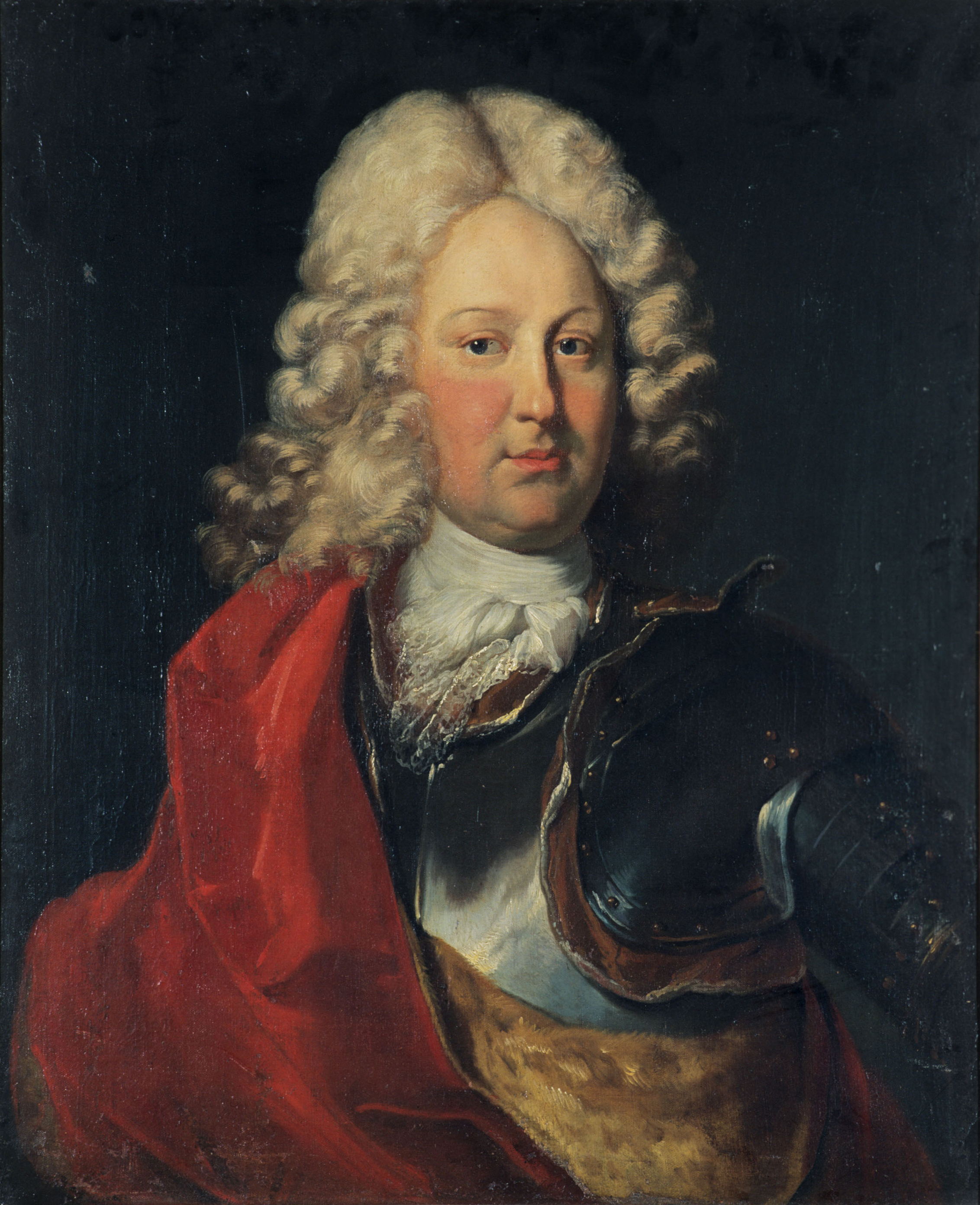
Markgraf Carl III. Wilhelm von Baden-Durlach (1710)

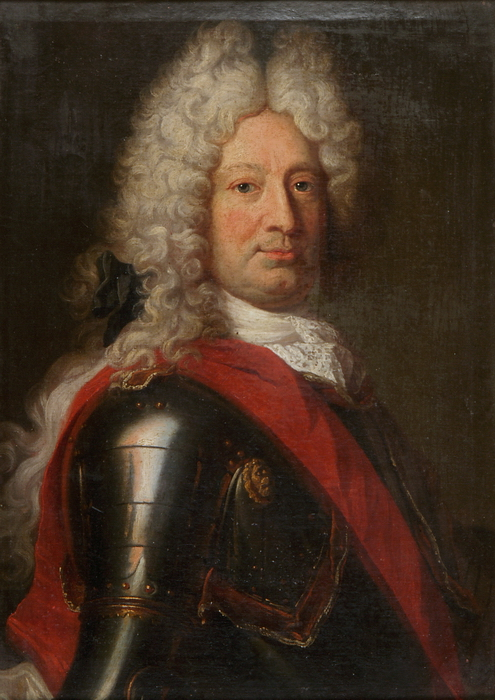
Marschall von Mentzingen

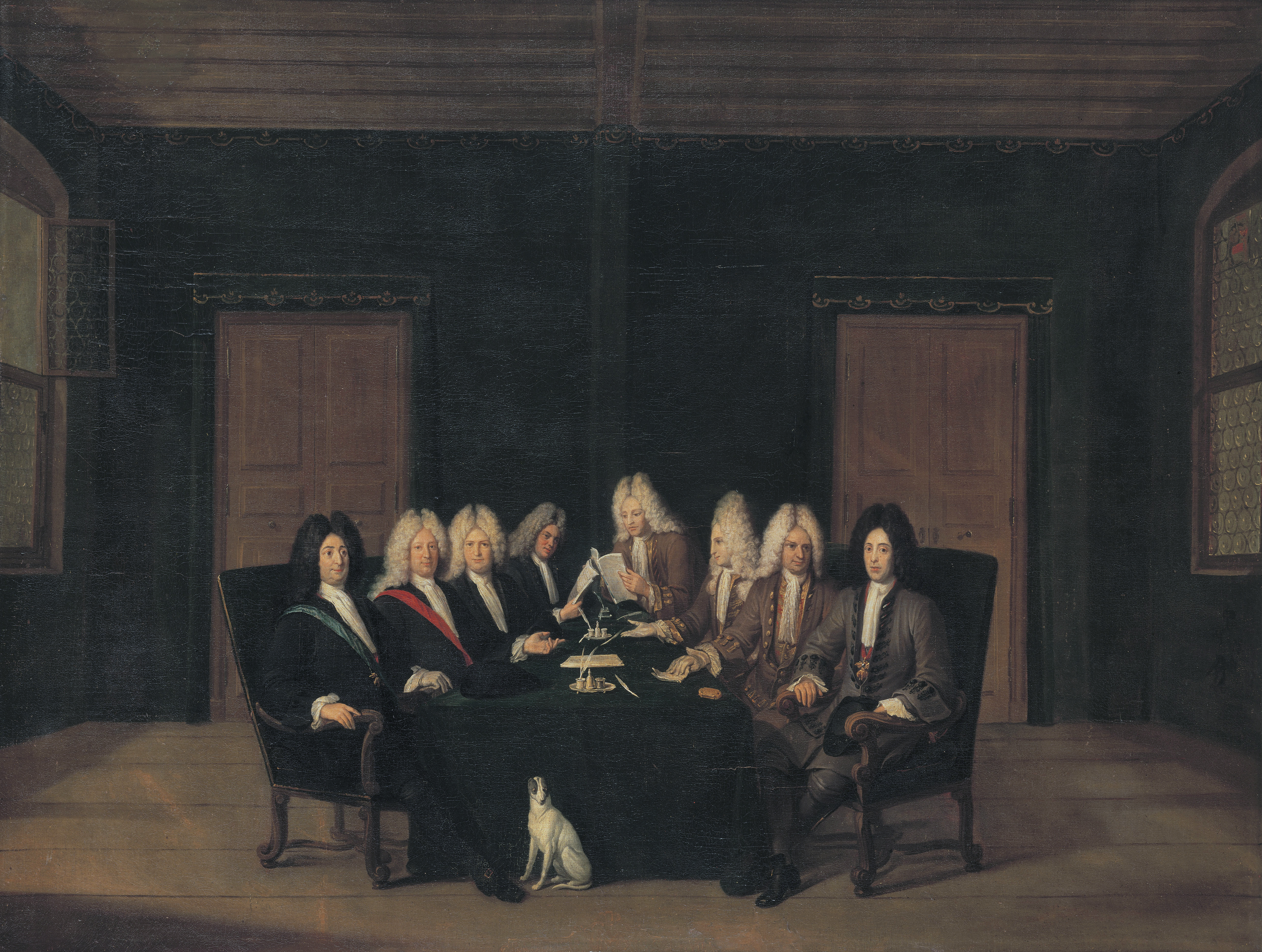
The Congress of Baden (1714)

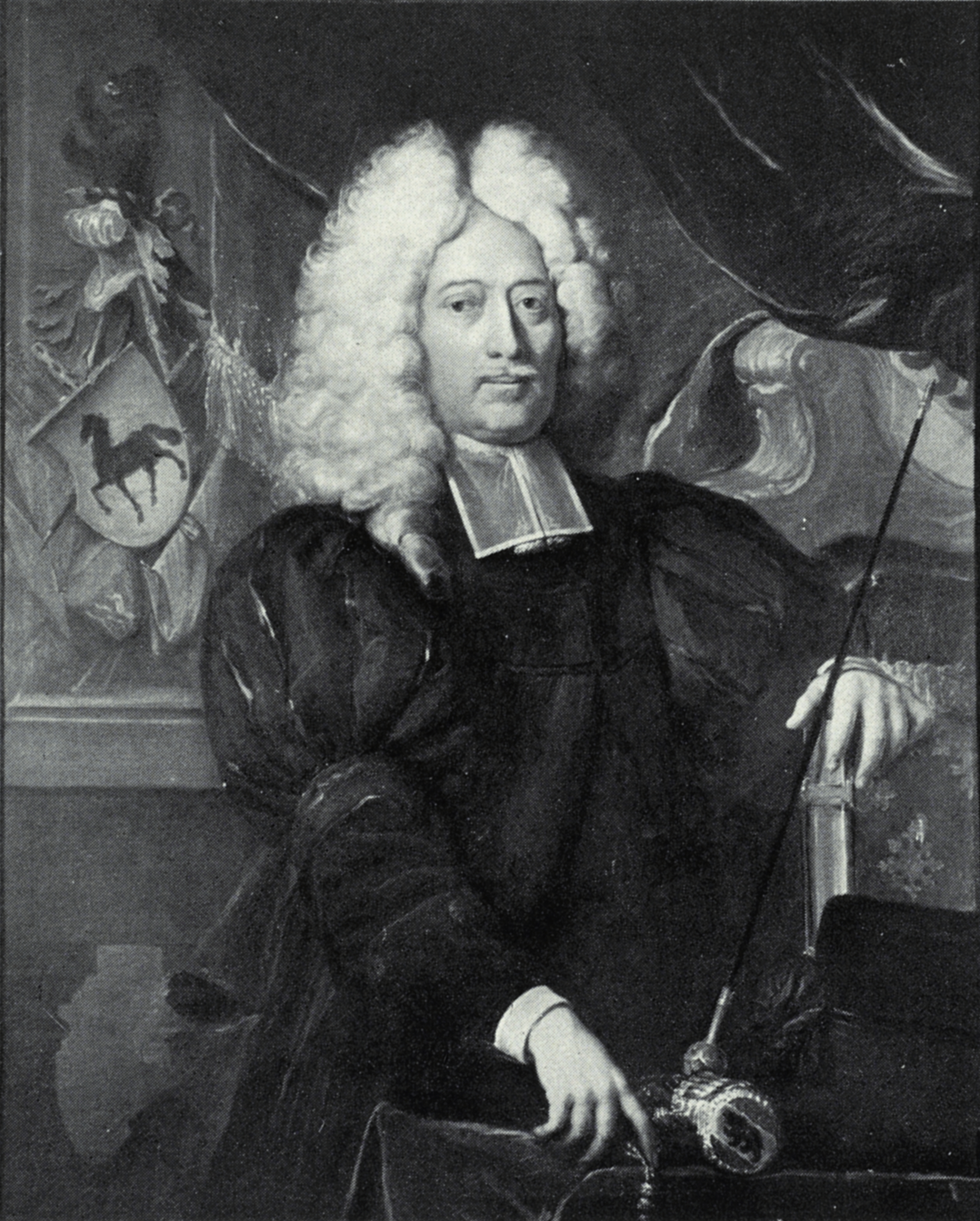
Samuel Frisching

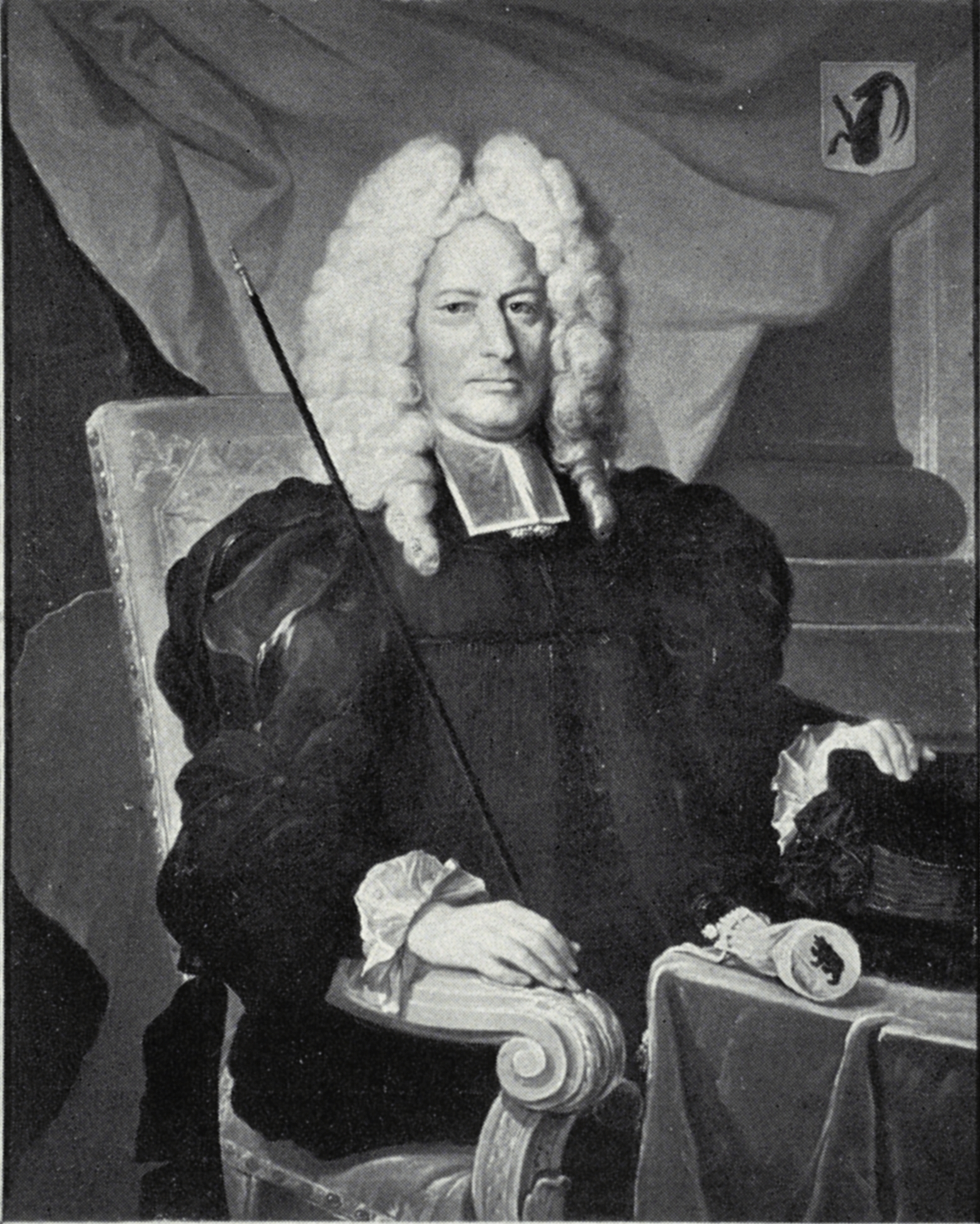
Christoph Steiger

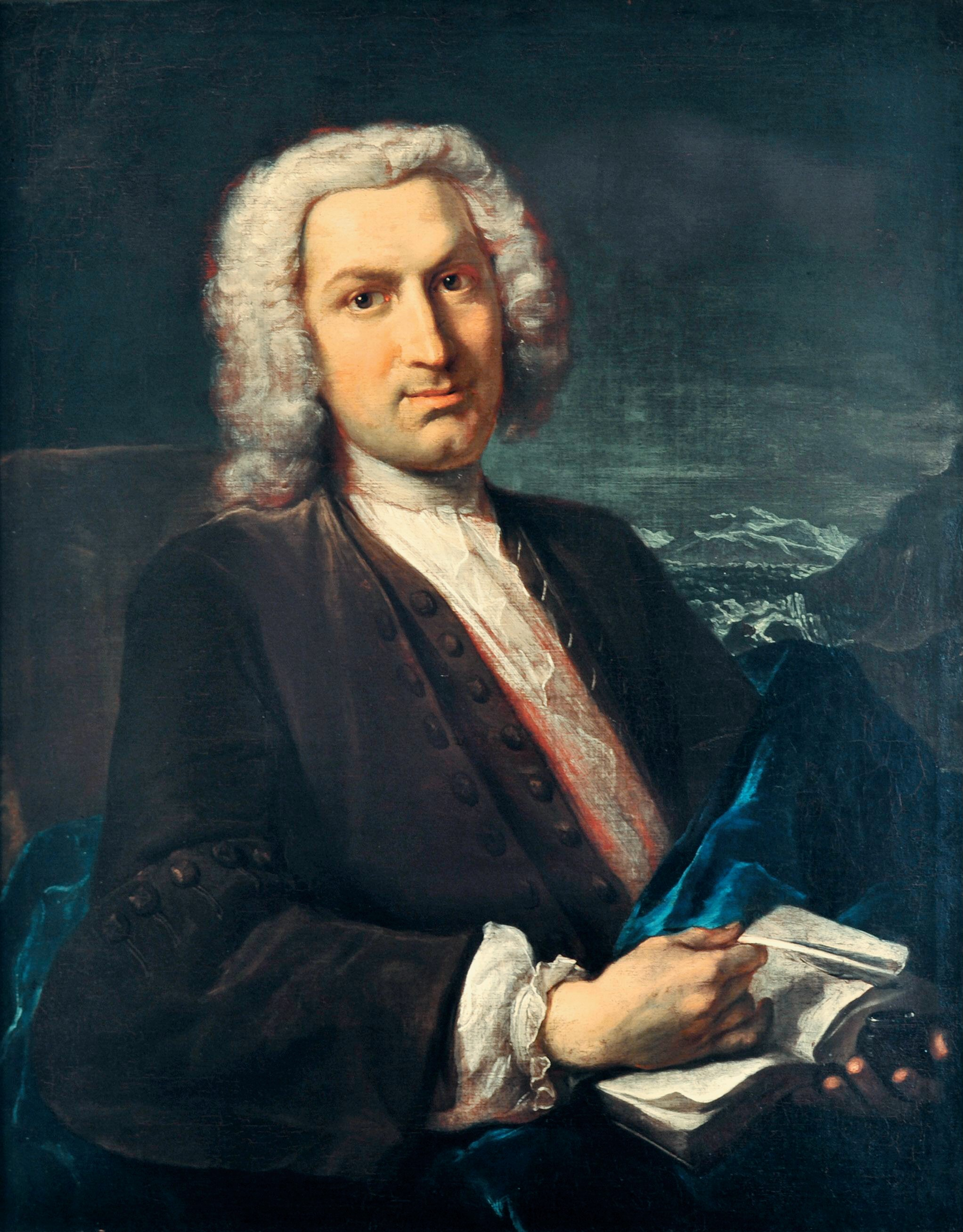
Albrecht von Haller

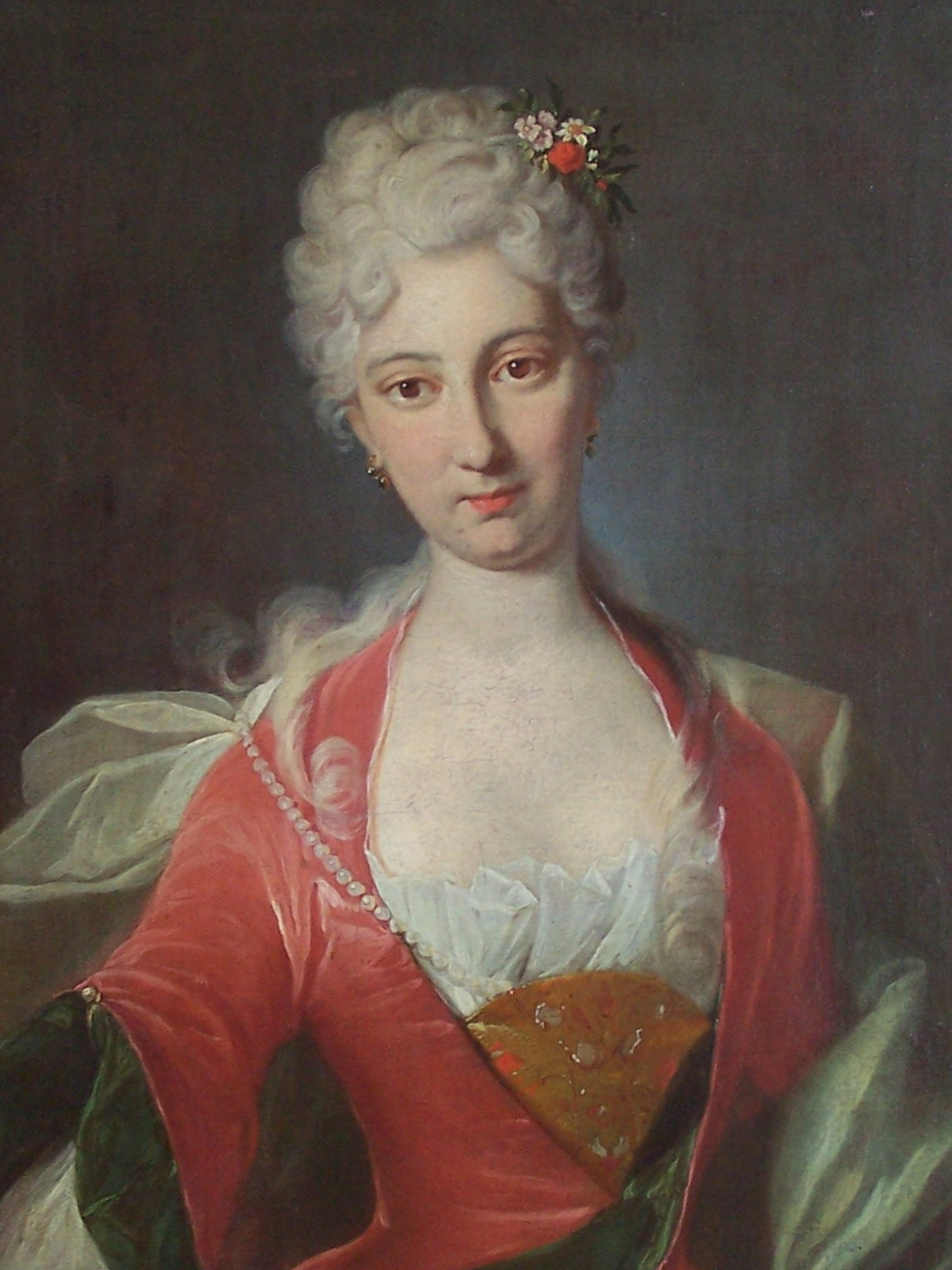
Portrait of an unknown woman

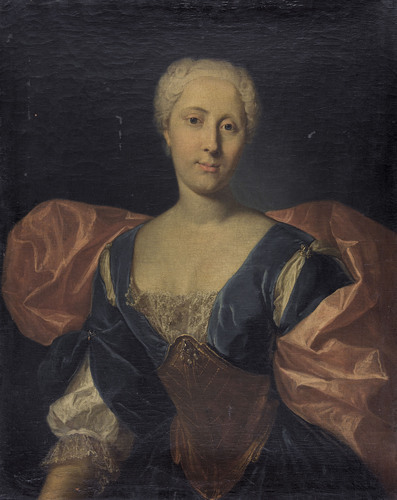
Susanna Elisabetha Lupicki

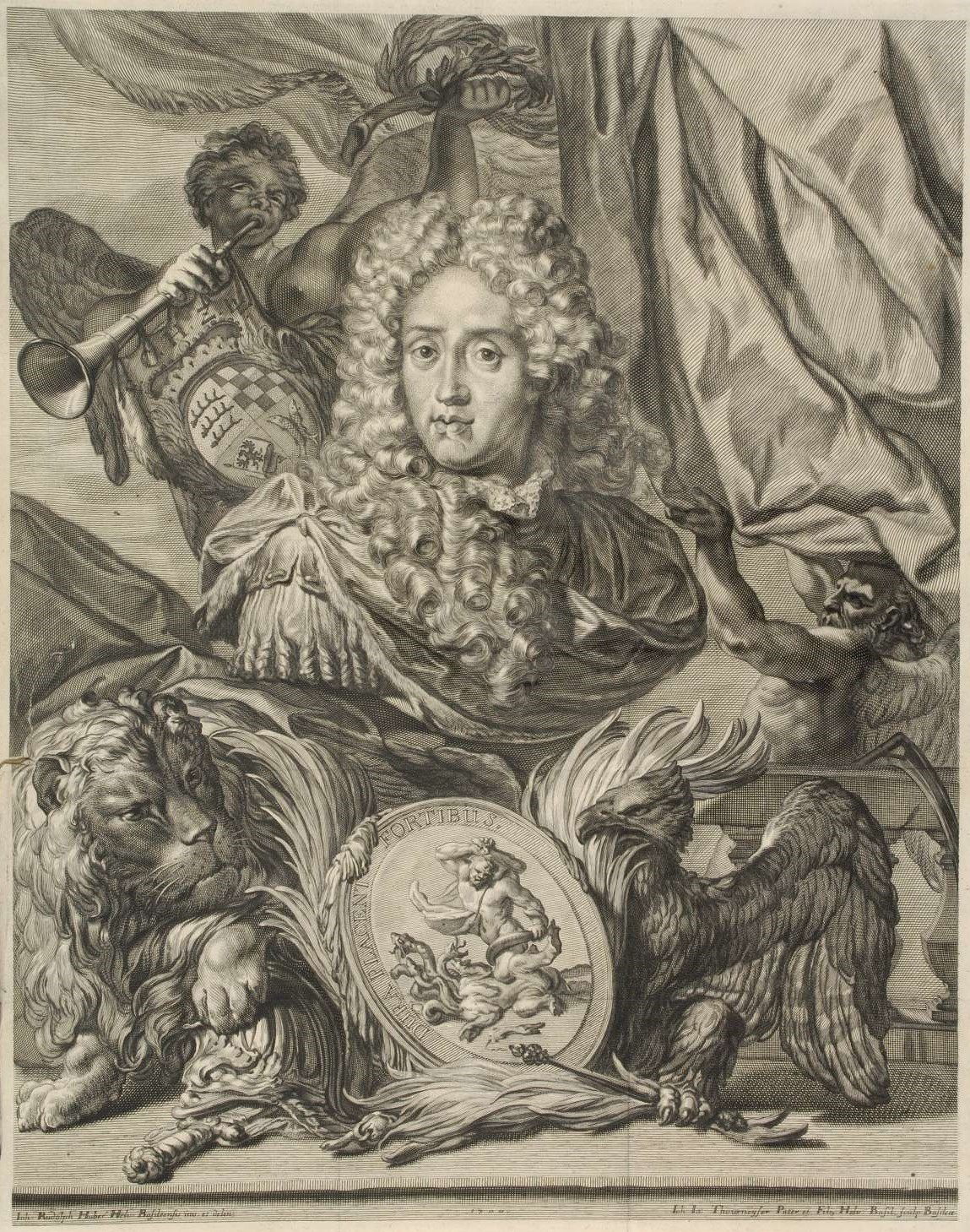
Friedrich Karl von Württemberg, 1700

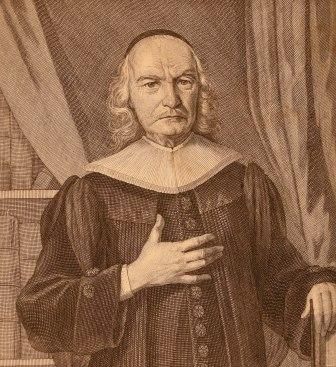
Johann Rudolf Rudolf

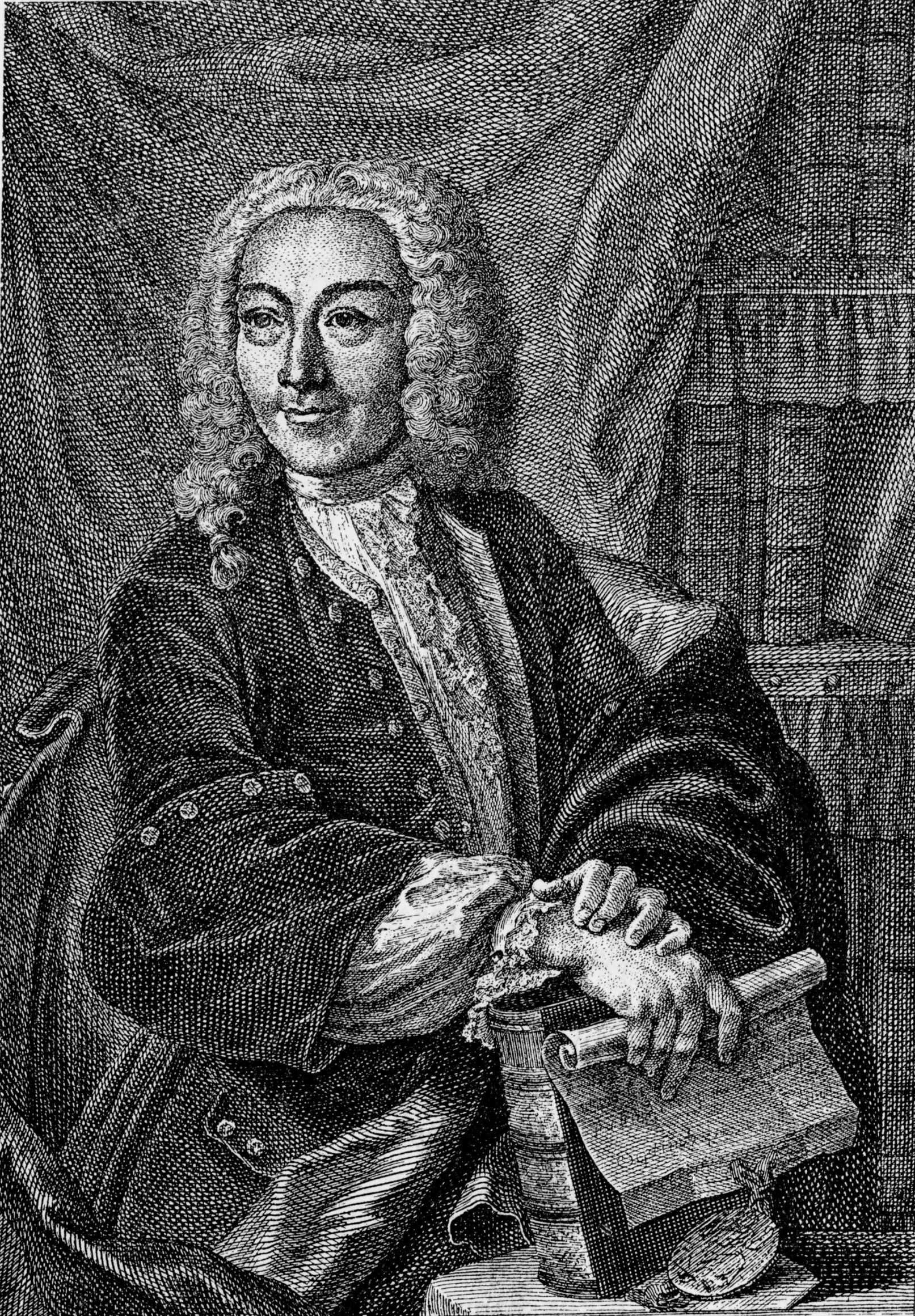
Carl Friedrich Drollinger

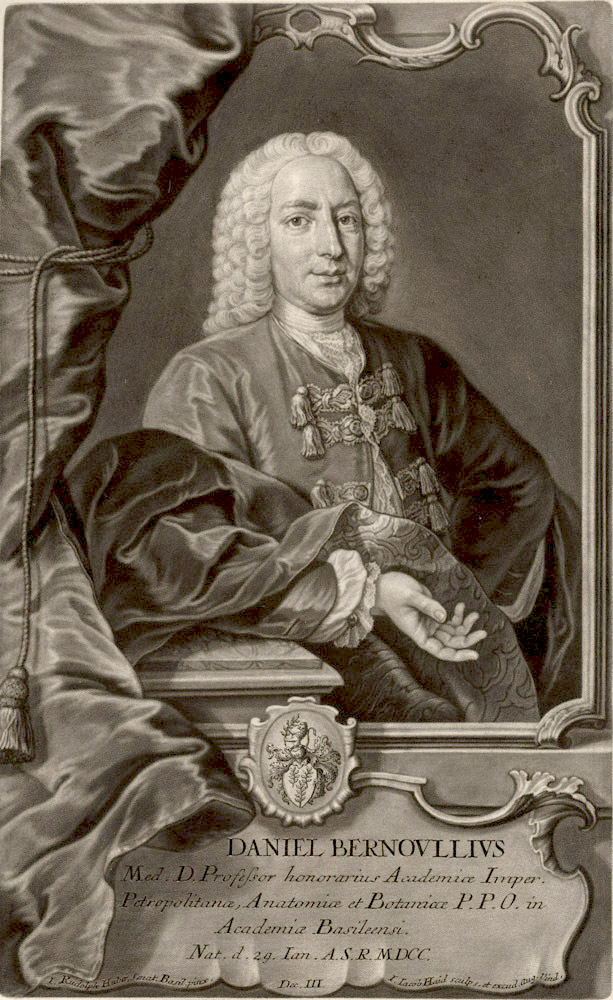
Daniel Bernoulli

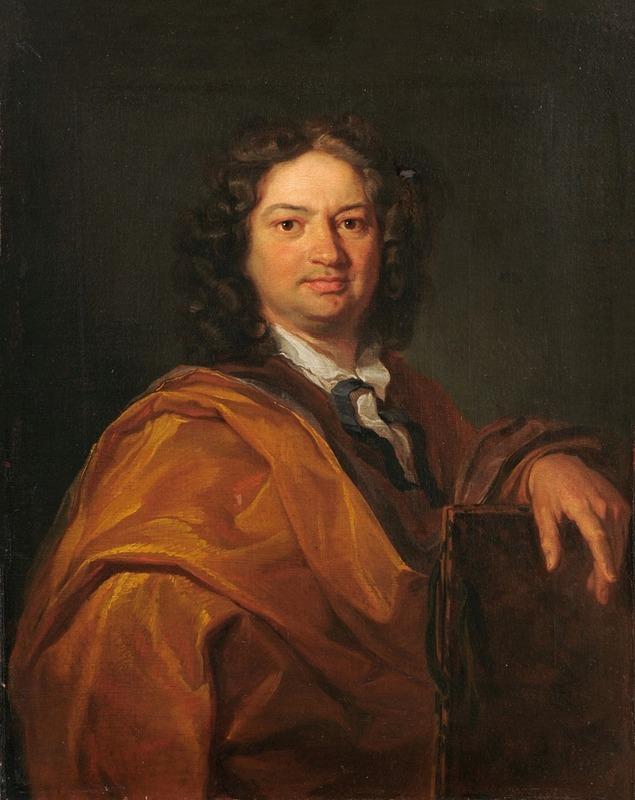
Self-portrait (1703)
