= Dai Xi =

19th-century Chinese artist

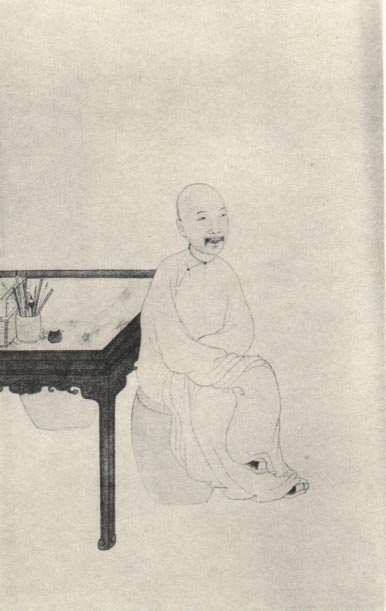
Dai Xi in Portraits of Scholars of the Qing Period

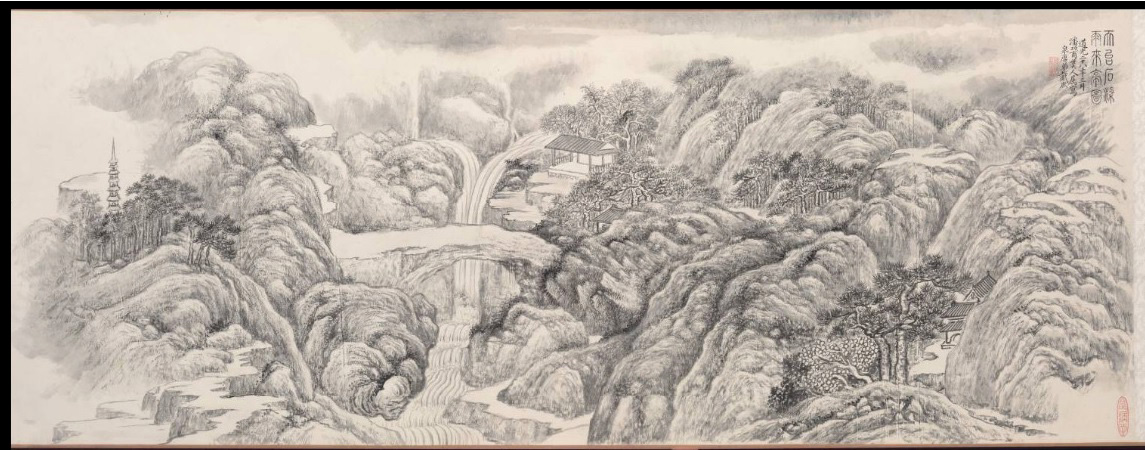
DaiXi Stone Bridge Mountain Tiantai, Cleveland Museum of Art

Dai Xi (Chinese: 戴熙; pinyin: Dài Xī; Wade–Giles: Tai Hsi) (1801–1860) was a 19th-century Chinese painter and representative of the academic manner. His sobriquet was Chunshi (醇士) or 'Pure-Minded Scholar' and his pen name was Yu'an (榆庵) or 'Elm Retreat', among others.

== Biography ==
Dai Xi was a native of Qiantang (钱塘) near the cultural center of Hangzhou, although he spent many years in Guangzhou. In 1832 he joined officialdom, becoming a member of the Hanlin Academy. He later became Vice Minister of the Ministry of War, although absenting himself later for illness.

During the Taiping Rebellion Hangzhou was occupied by the rebels in 1860. Dai joined in the defense of the city and later committed suicide there by drowning himself in a pond. Dai was subsequently given the posthumous title Wenjie or 'Cultured and Moderate'. Dai Xi painted in the manner of the great academic master Wang Hui of the previous century, although Dai Xi was said to have exceeded the master in artistic elegance. His work is similar to that of his contemporary Tang Yifen; together they were referred to as Tang-Dai. Dai's works are usually landscapes. His works include a generous mixture of genre subjects such as plants and humans.

In 1920 and 1934, published collections of his paintings appeared in China. Dai was also an avid coin collector, publishing a three-volume (卷) work on the subject, Guchuan zonghua (古泉丛话).
