= Jeannie Peterson =

Journalist

- Born: Jeannie Peterson; February 18, 1940; Suttons Bay, Michigan, United States
- Died: February 19, 2024 (aged 84); Cardiff by the Sea, California, United States

Jeannie Peterson was editor-in-chief of Ambio, a journal of the human environment published by the Royal Swedish Academy of Sciences in Stockholm, author of "The Aftermath: The Human and Ecological Consequences of Nuclear War" which was written for Ambio, and served with the United Nations in several capacities including Deputy Director of Public Information and External Relations, country director of United Nations Population Fund in the Philippines, as a United Nations peacekeeper dealing with political issues during the Serb-Croat wars in the former Yugoslavia, and at United Nations headquarters addressing global population and environmental issues.

== Education ==
Jeannie earned a Master of Science in Journalism (with minors in psychology and history of art) from Northwestern University Pritzker School of Law in Chicago, Illinois. Jeannie then studied environmental sciences at Stockholm University in Sweden.

== Career ==
=== Ambio ===
When Ambio: A Journal of the Human Environment was published by the Royal Swedish Academy of Sciences in Stockholm. Ambio was considered to be the eminent environmental journal dealing with international issues. Jeannie was Assistant editor from 1972-1977, and Editor-in-Chief,1978-1983.

As editor, Jeannie considered it important that the economic and political aspects of discoveries in the environmental sciences be addressed. In 1982, she noted that existing studies on the effects of nuclear war had not adequately addressed the environmental effects. She initiated the publication of a special double issue of Ambio, published in 1982 - and later a book in 1984 called "The Aftermath: The Human and Ecological Consequences of Nuclear War", published in England by Pergamon Press and in the US by Pantheon Books. She invited the scientist Paul Crutzen to contribute an article to that issue which explored the atmospheric consequences of nuclear war. His co-authored Ambio article for that issue provided the impetus for the "nuclear winter" theory, which was later developed further by other scientists such as Carl Sagan. The Ambio issue/book originated and explored the idea that there might be no winner in a nuclear war because of the probably disastrous after-effects of climatic cooling caused by soot that would circulate around the atmosphere and potentially block warmth from the sun, with devastating effects around the northern hemisphere. The General Secretary of the Communist Party of the Soviet Union, Mikhail Gorbachev, who met with the then-US President Ronald Reagan, afterwards stated that the nuclear winter effect had a decisive impact on his decision to embark on a peaceful, non-nuclear relationship between the US and USSR. She went on to serve as Director of the Public Information Center for the Consequences Nuclear War in Washington DC in 1984.

This special issue of Ambio is credited with transforming the scientific understanding of the outcomes for a nuclear war. In 2022, Jeannie Peterson was among eight winners of the Future of Life Award. The award was given to Peterson for "reducing the risk of nuclear war by catalyzing and popularizing the science of nuclear winter."

=== United Nations ===
For the next two decades Jeannie worked primarily for organizations in the United Nations. She first served as Deputy Chief Information and External Relations with the United Nations Population Fund in New York City from 1981-1985. She served as Senior Information Policy Officer from 1985-1986. She served as Country Director with United Nations Population Fund in Manila from 1986-1990. She served as Deputy Chief Governing Council with the United Nations liaison and external relations in New York in 1990, preparing population and environment issues for governments around the world. She was often traveled around the United States with non-governmental organizations to address civic groups, college commencements, graduate classes, television, and radio.

When the UN became involved in mediating the wars in the former Yugoslavia, Jeannie took a leave of absence from UNFPA, and joined the largest peacekeeping mission ever fielded, the United Nations Protection Force, or UNPROFOR, with 54 thousand mission members. Rebel Serbs living in Croatia had conducted a war with the new Croatian Government, accusing it of fascist tendencies and rights violations against the sizeable Serb minority living in Croatia. The rebel Serbs were considered to be under the influence of President Slobodan Milošević of Serbia. As the head of UNPROFOR's political office in Belgrade, Jeannie often found herself across the negotiating table from President Milosevic, who many considered responsible for initiating the wars.

At that time the Serb/Croat war in Croatia was still ongoing along the borders of the three Serb enclaves in Croatia. Jeannie was then given an additional posting, to the Rebel Krajina Serb stronghold of Knin in Southwestern Croatia, where she headed UNPROFOR's regional office and was the negotiator with the rebel Serbs' political leaders.

From 1996 to 1998 Jeannie returned to work with the region on a different UN mission, UNTAES, United Nations Transitional Administration for Eastern Slavonia, Baranja and Western Sirmium. Eastern Slavonia borders the Danube River, with Serbia just across the water. She was given responsibility for dealing with the issues of reconciliation, religion, and the re-integration of the Rebel Serbs into the Croatian government. Under UNTAES, the eastern territory of Croatia that had been forcefully taken by Rebel Croatian Serb forces in 1991 was peacefully restored under Croatian Government authority.

Jeannie's last mission to the troubled Southwestern area of Croatia from 1999 to 2001 was called the Organization for Security and Co-operation in Europe Mission to Croatia. She again was given responsibility for the former Sector South, which had been a stronghold of the Rebel Serb leadership. There was real interest on the part of the international community to assist the Croatian Serbs who had fled that area in 1995, to return, in accordance with international conventions, to their war-ravaged mountains and valleys to work with the Croatian Government. Considering that many essential documents had been destroyed during the war, the return of the Croatian Serbs to their traditional homelands in Southwestern Croatia did not occur easily.

=== Future of Life Award ===
Jeannie was awarded the 2022 Future of Life Award for her contributions in discovering and popularising nuclear winter. Additional recipients of this award were John Birks, Paul Crutzen, Alan Robock, Carl Sagan, Georgiy Stenchikov, Brian Toon, and Richard Turco.

== Personal ==
Jeannie was born in Suttons Bay, Michigan. Her father, Paulus Peterson, was a cherry farmer. She married Kurt Ekenberger of Sweden, a photographer she met while working as a travel writer and ski sweater model in Ketchum, Idaho.

She was a long-time partner of Cedric Thornberry. Jeannie and Cedric spent time in Montauk, New York; the island-country of Cyprus and to Korčula, an island off the Dalmatian Coast of Croatia; and the Champlain Islands of Vermont. In Vermont, she served on the board of the local arts organization, Island Arts, and had a small business in art photography – photographing the ever-changing elements of sky, wind and water. Her work was exhibited at the Island Arts Gallery of the Merchant's Bank on the Champlain Islands, the North Hero Town Hall in the Champlain Islands, the Brian Memorial Gallery in Stowe, Vermont, at the Forchgott and Sourdiffe Gallery in Shelburne, Vermont, and at the Champlain Valley exposition in Vermont. She has since moved to California, where she enjoys retirement near her niece and family, on the Pacific Ocean.
