= Mym Tuma =

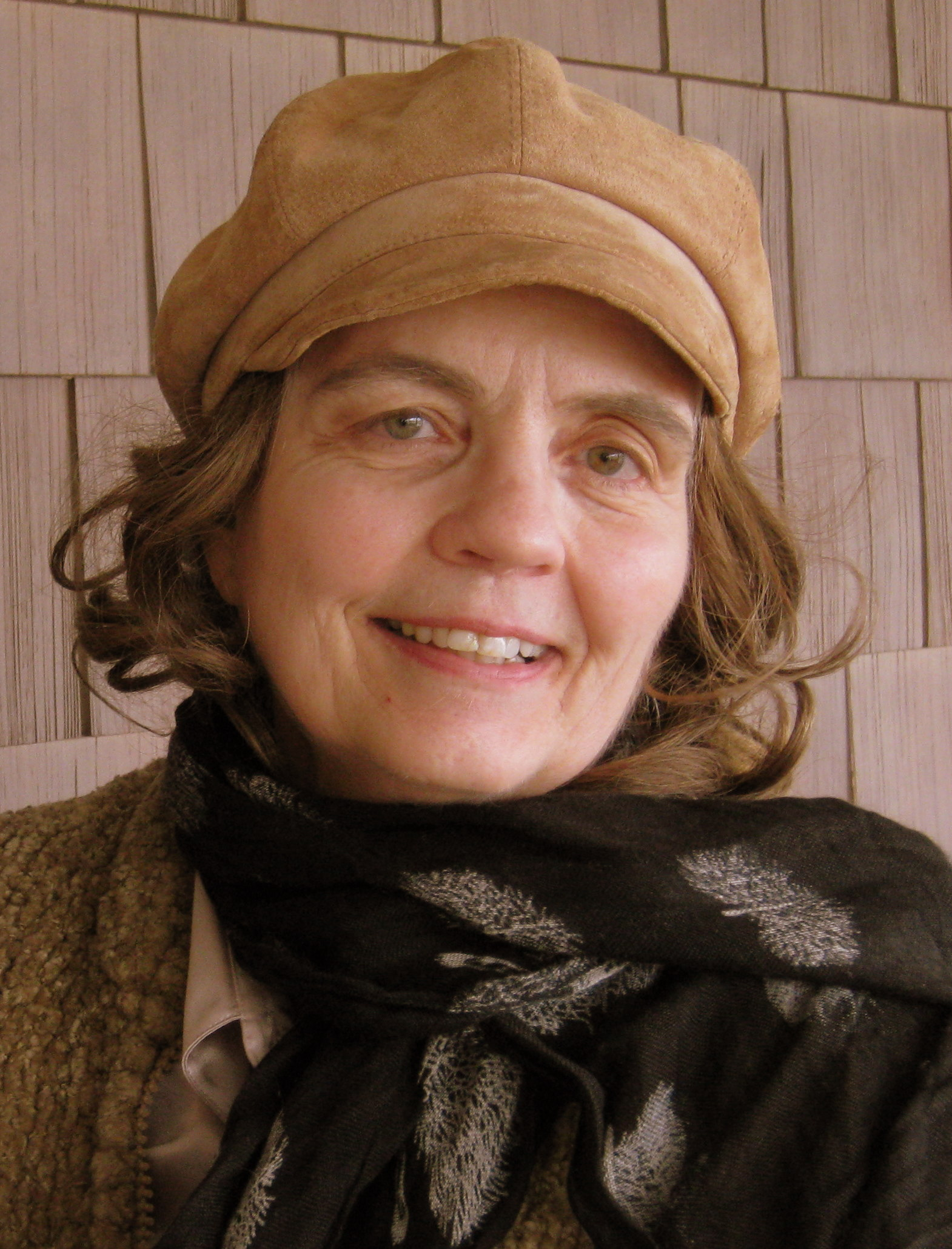
- Mym Tuma in Southampton, 2008
- Born: Marilynn Thuma; September 23, 1940; Berwyn, Illinois, United States
- Known for: Painting
- Notable work: Sculptured Paintings

Mym Tuma (born 23 September 1940), also known as Marilynn Thuma, is an American painter and artist.

== Biography ==
Born in Berwyn, Illinois, Mym Tuma studied at Northwestern University in Evanston; at Stanford University in California and at New York University. After graduation, she experimented with three-dimensional works in her studio that she set up in Lake Chapala, Mexico.

Tuma first met O’Keeffe in 1964 and during the following decade the two artists discovered several common interests, including an enthusiasm for each other’s art. This is shown from the various handwritten letters between Georgia O'Keeffe and Tuma. An exhibit of her work hung in Edens Gallery during November 1987 during Columbia College’s “Georgia O'Keeffe Centennial Celebration.”

A pastel exhibition curated by Henry Geldzahler, former curator of 20th Century Painting at the Metropolitan Museum of Art, hung at the Clayton Liberatore Gallery, Bridgehampton. In 1992 she lectured at the Brooklyn Museum. Tuma is a charter member of the National Museum of Women in the Arts, and exhibits her sculptured paintings. She works on the East End of Long Island, NY. Examples of her work are on display at the Hirshhorn Museum and Sculpture Garden, in Washington, DC.

She has created abstracted works on paper from oval, spherical, radial, branching and spiraling growth patterns found in nature. Her art conveys an understanding of universal structures in living things and how the process of conserving energy creates order. In 2005, Tuma authored Radiant Energy, Light In My Pastel Paintings. Her previous books include poetry in Awakening The Spirit, The Blue Planet Series, and essays on the creative process in The Shell Theory of the Sculptured Paintings, and O’Keeffe & Me: Abstracts of Our Letters.

Tuma’s emphasis on organic forms and their structural and mathematical underpinnings tie her to the artistic category of an organic minimalist. Her work is unique in the way she creates shaped forms that exist in three-dimensional space, what Tuma calls her sculptured painting.

Her artistic approach, has been predominantly influenced by oceanic and coastal forms, such as beach pebbles, sand, sprouting seeds, and spiraling shell forms. Recently, Mym has been showing her artwork at the Lauren G shop in Sag Harbor and the Full Moon Art Gallery in East Moriches.

During 2005, Mym Tuma exhibited work in the Merchants Bank gallery in South Hero, Vermont. Invited by curator Jeannie Peterson, the exhibition's featured painting was a calla lily in dark blue space, a stylized image tilting within a square representing ground zero. The stripes conjured up the memory of the twin towers from the view of them burning and later two memorial shafts of blue light.
