= Friedrich Traffelet =

Bernese painter and illustrator

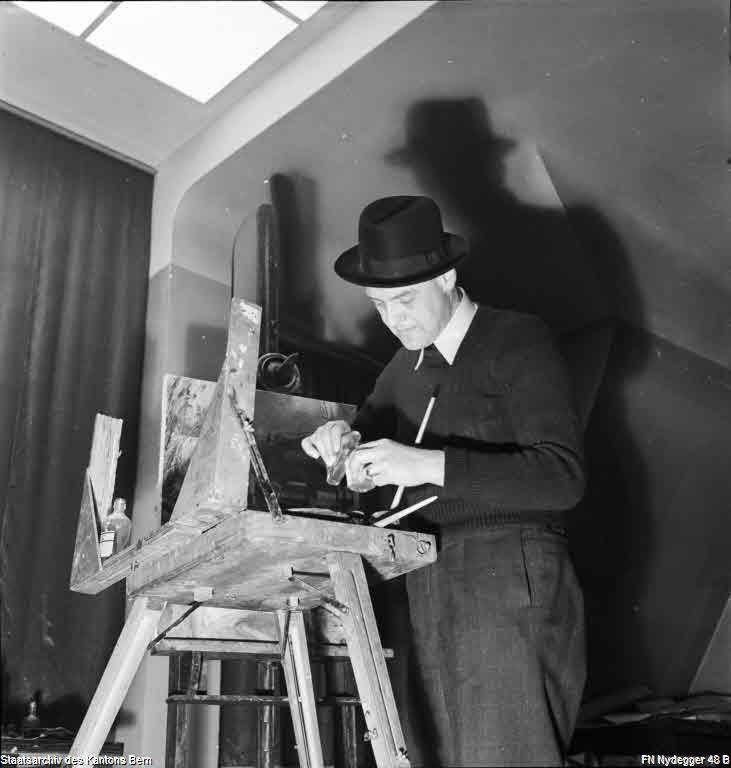
Traffelet 1942

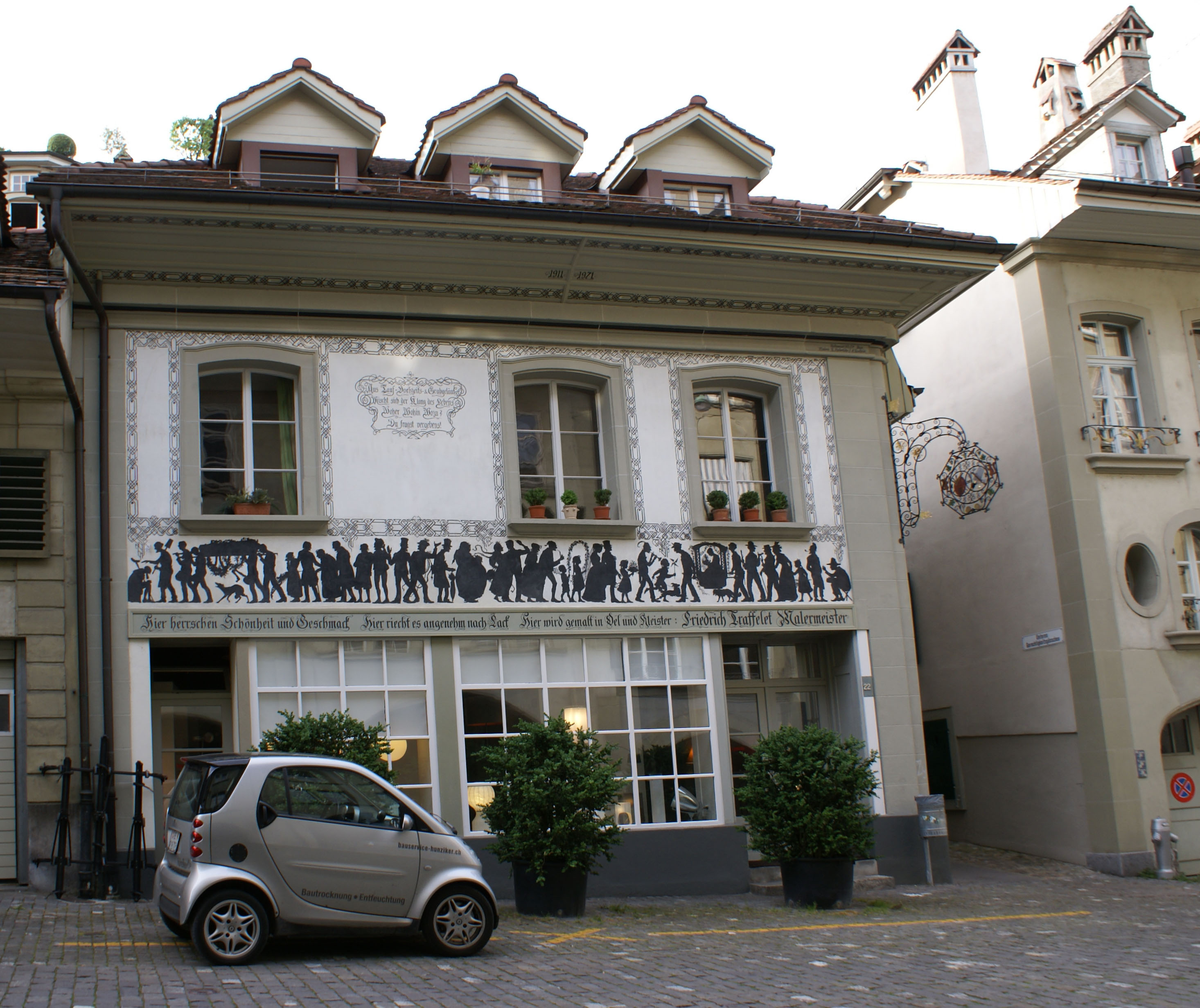
Friedrich Traffelet's atelier on Junkerngasse 22, Bern.

Friedrich Eduard Traffelet, popularly Fritz Traffelet (1897–1954) was a Bernese painter and illustrator.

After studies in Zürich and Paris, he married Alice Rondi in 1921. In the 1930s, Traffelet gained renown as a military painter and served in the Swiss Army during World War II from 1939 to 1945. Done in a 19th-century style, his paintings and illustrations of soldierly life have become defining images of Switzerland in World War II.

In the 1940s and 1950s, Traffelet also executed a wide range of portraits, landscape paintings and facade paintings. They most often depict historic or traditional genre scenes, reflecting his generally conservative outlook.
