= Erlacherhof =

Town mansion in the Old City of Bern, Switzerland

Coordinates: 46°56′51″N 7°27′13″E

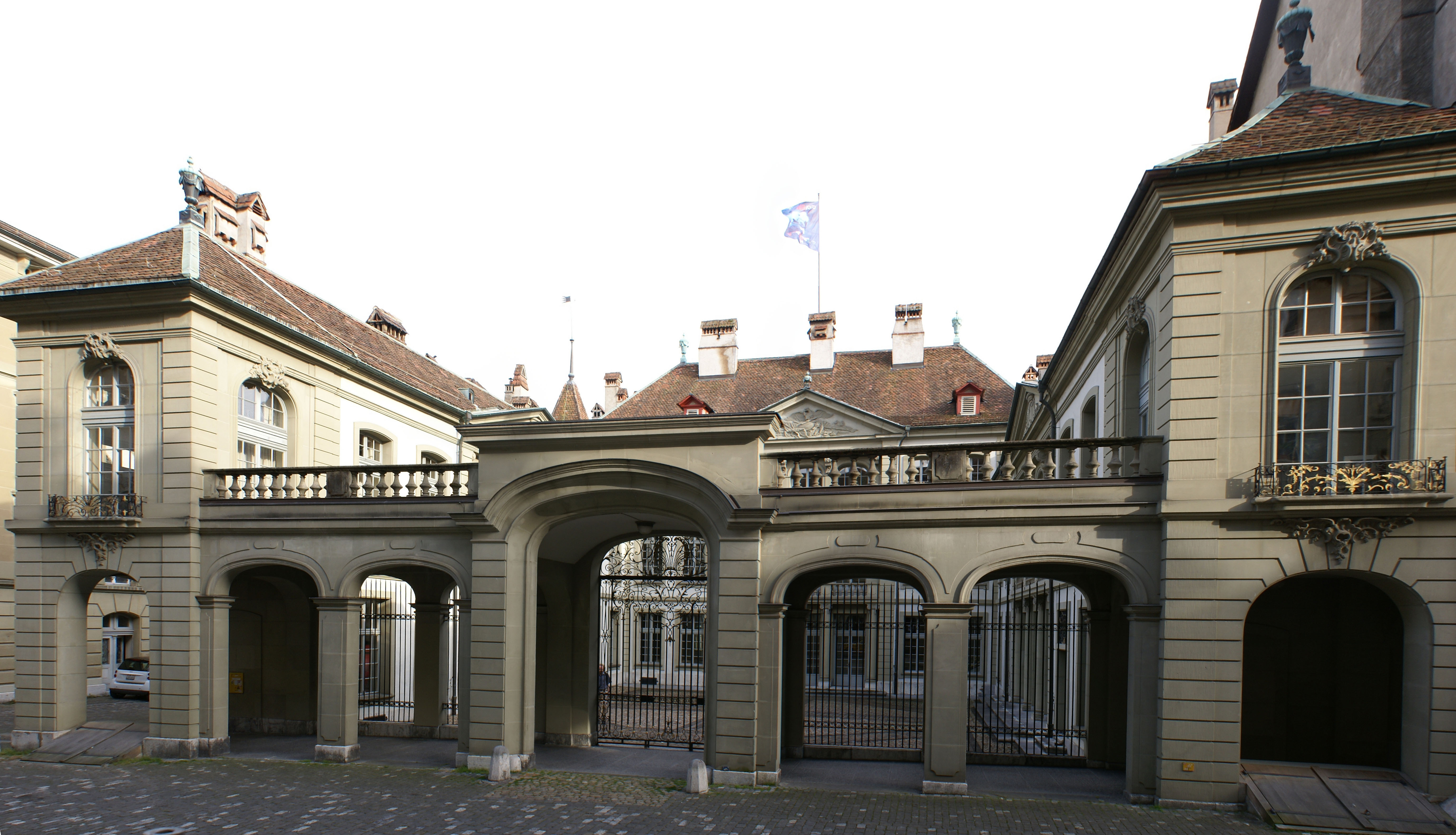
North façade with the main entrance to the courtyard of the Erlacherhof

The Erlacherhof is a town mansion on the Junkerngasse No. 47 in the Old City of Bern, Switzerland.

== History ==
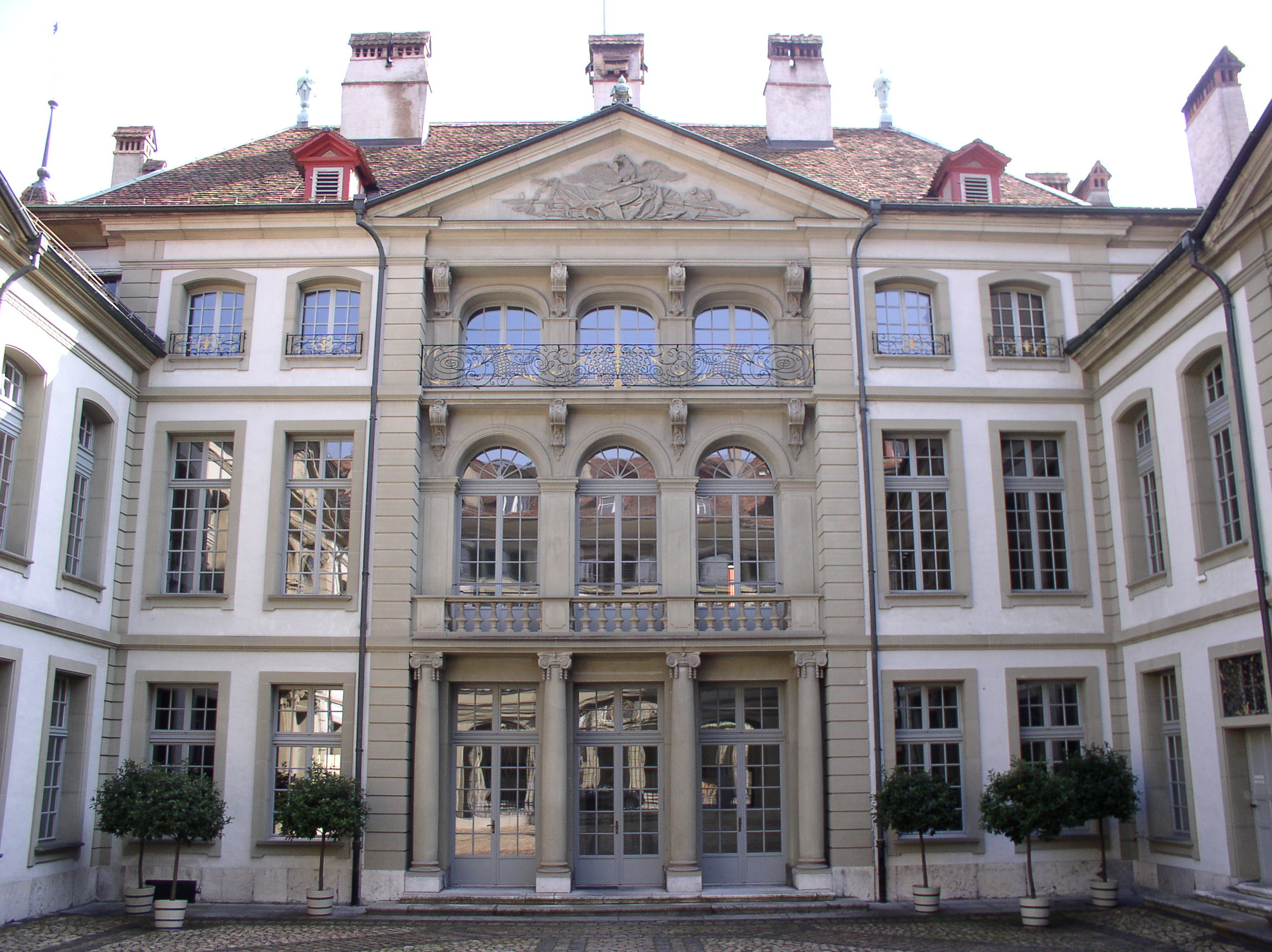
Courtyard with the main entrance of the Erlacherhof

The Erlacherhof was built between 1745 and 1752 after the plans of the Bernese architect Albrecht Stürler for the Bernese patrician Hieronymus von Erlach.From 1848 until 1857, the mansion was the first official seat of the Swiss Federal Council. The mansion is the official seat of the mayor of Bern and his administration.

== Literature ==
- Ueli Bellwald (Hrsg.): Der Erlacherhof in Bern - Baugeschichte, Restaurierung, Rundgang, Bern 1980 ISBN 3-7272-9051-X
