= Thomas Tudor =

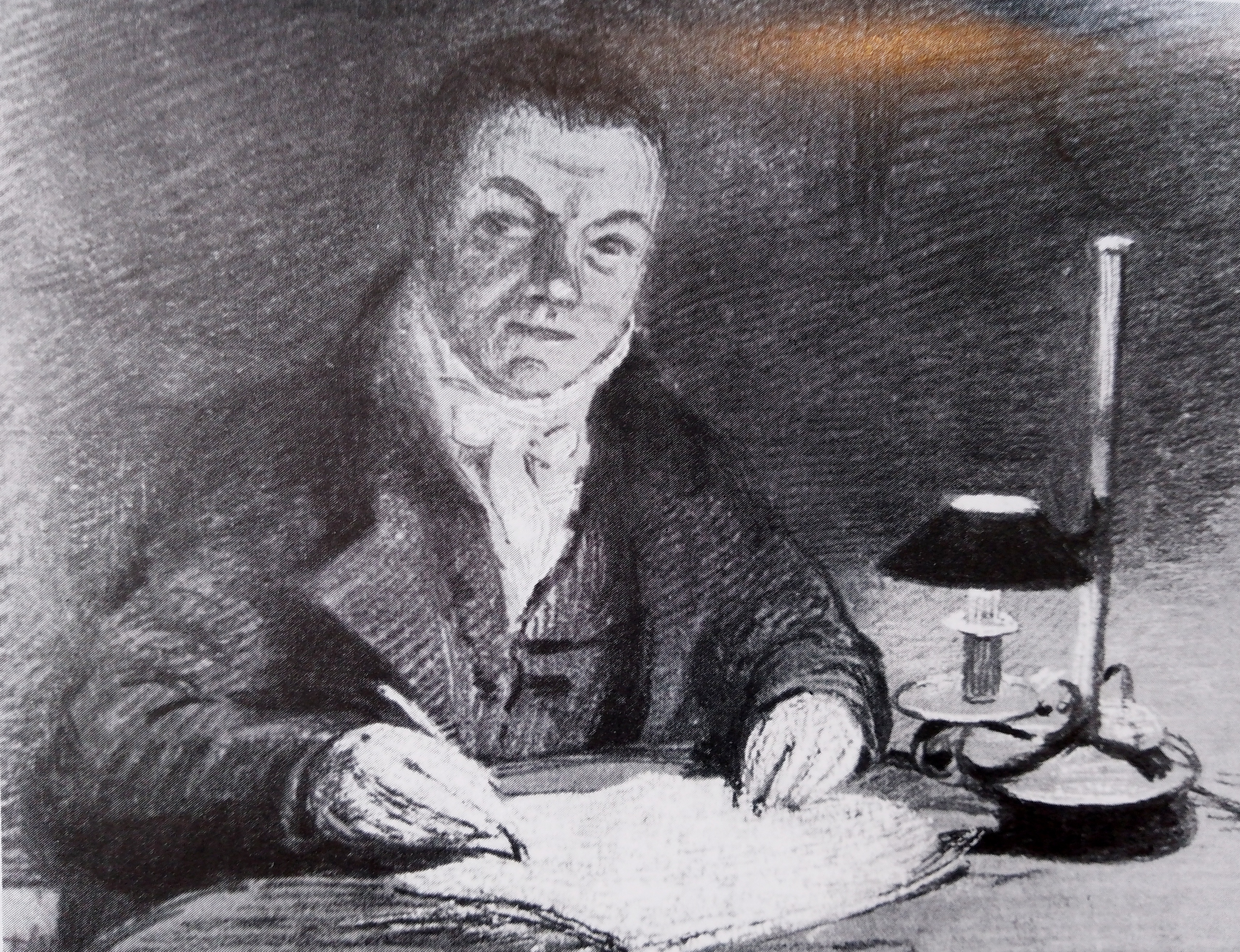
- Self portrait
- Born: 3 July 1785; Monmouth
- Died: 1855 (aged 69–70)
- Occupations: Artist; land agent
- Known for: Water colours

Thomas Tudor (3 July 1785 – 1855) was a Welsh artist and land agent based in Monmouth.

== Biography ==
Tudor was born in Monmouth on 3 July 1785 and christened at St Mary's Church. His family had come to Monmouth after they had lost the family fortune. Tudor's grandfather, James Tudor Morgan, has been High Sheriff of Monmouthshire in 1744. His father, Owen Tudor, worked as a bookseller earning money to bring up his children which included two boys with artistic talents. Thomas and John Tudor's help together with their father's assistance in creating sketches and diagrams for his book Historical Tour in Monmouthshire was acknowledged by Archdeacon William Coxe. This was despite Tudor being only thirteen and his brother was just fifteen.

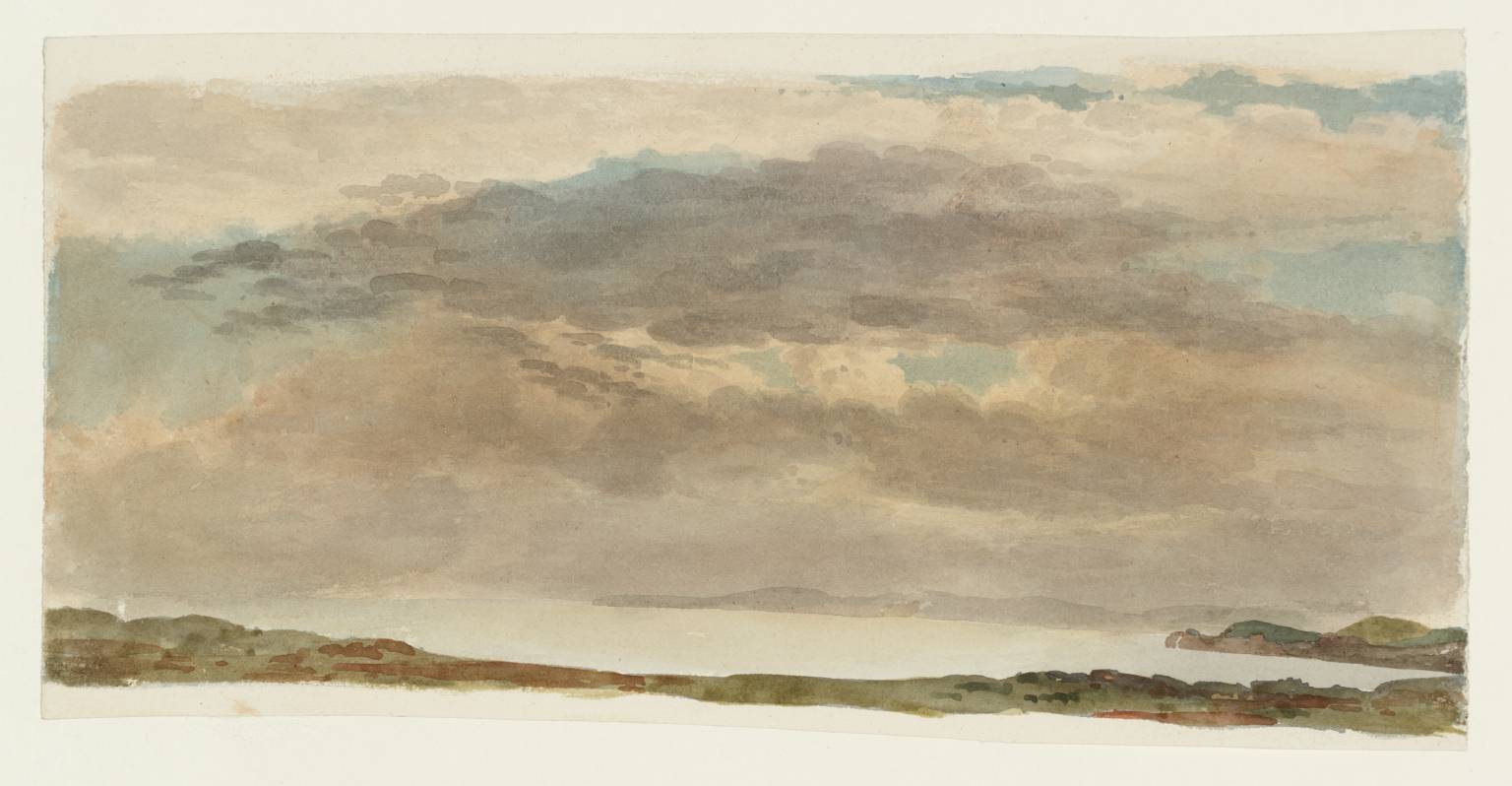
Evening Landscape

From 1809 to 1819, both brothers exhibited at the Royal Academy and John continued for an additional three years. Thomas's seventeen successfully accepted paintings were mostly typographical but six were portraits. Thomas was known for the amazing detail of his sketches of buildings. Although he did paint in oils it is his, frequently monochrome, water colours that are more common. These water colours were very detailed but frequently incomplete.

Around 1825 Tudor began to spend more time on being a land agent for Colonel Henry Morgan-Clifford. On his behalf he would collect rents in Carmarthenshire, Monmouthshire and near Ross-on-Wye. Tudor built "Tudor House" in the part of Monmouth which is called Wyesham. Tudor also owned property at Penallt. Tudor died in 1855 and he was buried in Dixton.

== Legacy ==
Tudor has painting in the Tate, the National Library of Wales, the Victoria and Albert Museum, Newport Museum and Monmouth Museum.
