= Tang Yifen =

Chinese landscape painter and calligrapher

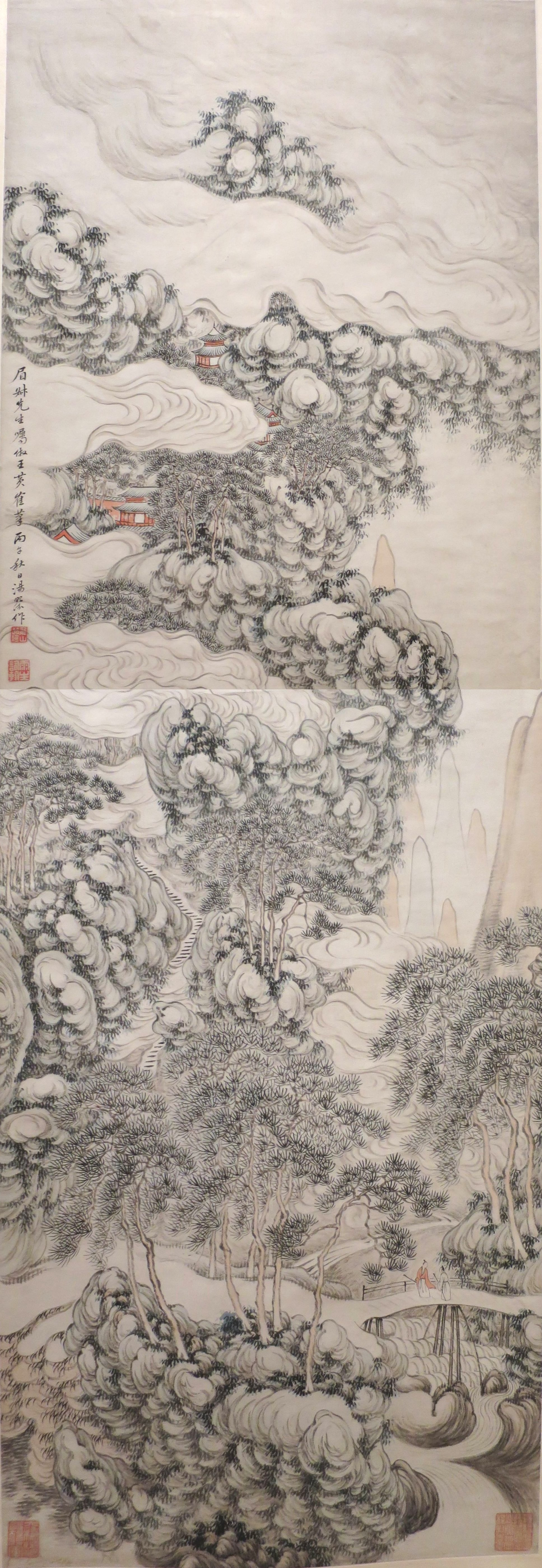
Lighthearted Paintings Inspired by Old Masters, painting by T'ang I-fen (Tang Yifen), 1849, Honolulu Museum of Art

Tang Yifen (Wade–Giles: T'ang I-fen, traditional: 湯貽汾, simplified: 汤贻汾, pinyin: Tāng Yífén); ca. 1778-1853 was a Chinese landscape painter and calligrapher during the Qing Dynasty (1644–1912).

Tang was born in the Jiangsu province. His style name was 'Ruoyi' and his sobriquets were 'Yusheng, Qing-ying monk and Zhouweng'. Tang painted landscapes and ink plums in a style of great sensitivity, much like Dai Xi. He also did calligraphy, especially running script.
