= Joseph Abeille =

French hydraulic and structural engineer

- Born: 14 July 1673; Vannes, Brittany, France
- Died: February 1756 (aged 82); Rennes, Brittany, France
- Occupations: Military engineer Hydraulic engineer Structural engineer Architect
- Spouses: Marie Charlotte Berthelot; Madeleine de Labat
- Children: Marguerite Jeanne Abeille, ca. 1707; Louis Paul Abeille, 1719; Jean Saturnin Abeille, 1720; Jean-Joseph Abeille, 1721; Marie Françoise Abeille, 1727 and others
- Parents: Blaise Abeillé; Renée Jameron

Joseph Abeille (14 July 1673 – February 1756) was a French hydraulic and structural engineer. After 1730 he also worked as a municipal architect.

== Biography ==
=== Family provenance and early years ===
Joseph Abeille was born in Vannes, a coastal town protected by its position at the head of the Gulf of Morbihan on the southern side of Brittany. For at least two thousand years the proximity of the Atlantic Ocean had closely impacted economic and political developments in the town. Blaise Abeille (or Abeillé), his father was a businessman from Marseille, where he entered into his first marriage which produced at least one child. Joseph Abeille was the second son from Blaise Abeille's second marriage which took place in Paris in 1762. At the time of her marriage to Blaise Abeille, Joseph's mother, born Renée Jameron, was already a (young) widow, whose first husband, Jacques Pavin, had been a minor aristocrat and a tax collector. The family's move to Brittany may was probably in connection with Blaise Abeille having obtained a government job, since at the time of his sons' births he was employed as a "receveur général des impôts et Billots" (tax collector) in the Bishopric of Vannes. Joseph's older brother was Olivier Abeille, born on 11 June 1672 and baptised less than a week later.

=== Military engineer ===
Joseph Abeille came to the attention of the Paris-based scientific establishment in 1699 when he applied successfully to the Académie royale des sciences to patent his radical design for flat vaulted roofing. He began his career as a French king's engineer. The position was a military one, in which he was employed from 1703 During this period France was engaged in an ambitious war which involved attempting to invade the Netherlands, much of which lay at or below sea-level. When the situation became desperate the Dutch military commander could—and on at least one occasion did—cut the dykes protecting a contested section of drained land, thereby displacing or drowning any French military personnel on it. An understanding of hydraulic engineering acquired a military importance unmatched before or since in French history. It was between 1703 and 1706 that Abeille acquired his reputation as an hydraulic engineer. In 1706 appreciation dawned on the French king that even the military might of France could not prevail on all fronts at once: attempts to invade the Netherlands were abandoned. Around one hundred military engineers were "retired" from the army in 1706. One of them was Joseph Abeille. Meanwhile in 1704 Abeille had also distinguished himself and enhanced his reputation at the naval Battle of Malaga, serving in the fleet under the command of the Count of Toulouse.

=== Geneva ===
Abeille undertook two lengthy stays in Switzerland, during which he worked in Geneva, Bern, Morges and Solothurn. His first significant Swiss project involved producing plans for what became Thunstetten Castle, which would become a prestigious new home of the Bernese Schultheiß, Hieronymus von Erlach. The plans are dated 1707 and the impressive castle - in reality a manor house complex in the then fashionable style (according to some who presumably had never been there) of the new Palace at Versailles, just outside Paris - was constructed between 1711 and 1713. Another early commission was the Maison de Saussure, a palatial town house constructed in Geneva between 1707 and 1712 for a businessman called Jean-Antoine Lullin. (Note: The house is identified in some sources as the "Hôtel Lullin". It later passed into the hands of the de Saussure family which is why it is now known as the "Maison de Saussure".) Between 1708 and 1711 he also worked for the city authorities in Geneva on the hydrological challenges presented by the city's location at the point on the lake at which its waters discharge (at variable rates according, approximately, to the time of year) into the River Rhône. Between 1708 and 1711 he designed and supervised the construction of what contemporaries called a "lifting machine" ("machine élévatoire"), which used the pressure from the flow of the water to force water up to the prosperous residences in the higher parts of the city, thereby creating piped water supplies at several different levels significantly more elevated than the lake-shore. The "Obelisk Fountain" in what is today known as the Place du Molard is a surviving element of the scheme. In 1715 he produced a proposal for major redevelopments at the Island Hospital ("Inselspital") in Bern but his plans, at this stage, were not implemented.

=== Bazacle Milling Company ===
By 1714 he was back in France, implementing technical solutions to reactivate a water mill of the Bazacle Company in Toulouse. The dam which was a component of the water mill had been broken by winter ice during 1709, and despite several years of attempting to repair it and the expenditure of an hundred thousand pounds, five years later the mill was still out of action; and it had become impossible to find anyone in the Toulouse area prepared to invest further in it. Abeille arrived from Geneva and agreed to finance the work in return for a 50% shareholding in the company along with the chairmanship of the company for as long as he should retain at least 30 of the company's 128 shares. (Note: The word translated here as "shares" is the slightly antiquated term "Uchaux" rather than the word "Actions" which would more normally be used in the French language today.) These financial arrangements, unusual at the time, can be seen as a significant indication of the progression towards "modern" capitalism that was under way in France at the time. The broken dam defied even the ingenuity of Joseph Abeille, and in the end he built a larger completely new dam a short distance downstream. The work was not without difficulties, but in 1720 the mill was able to resume operation after slightly more than 12 years of inactivity. By that time Abeille had sold half his shares "to Geneva investors", and had found himself facing a legal challenge from co-investors who believed he had failed to honour all his early commitments. He nevertheless retained more than 30 shares at this point. However, during 1732 he disposed of all his remaining shares, over a three months period, to a number of different investors, ending his association with the Bazacle Milling Company, which thereby returned to its former, more conventional, governance structure. Three hundred years after its completion the dam that Joseph Abeille constructed across the Garonne continues to serve Toulouse, but in 1888 the mill wheel was replaced by a small electricity generating facility: this was taken over by EDF in 1946, and in 2020 remains in production.

=== Montpellier ===
In 1717 Abeille was working in Montpellier where he was involved with planning and supervising the Place du Peyrou, a prestigious urban redevelopment programme which featured a city water supply with an aqueduct, along with an equestrian statue celebrating the (by this time recently deceased) king. He also spent some time working on the port installations at Sète.

=== Burgundy: plans for a canal ===
1724 found him in Dijon, where he teamed up with Jacques Gabriel to draw up plans for the construction of a stone bridge over the Saône, the "Pont de Seurre" (which unfortunately collapsed in 1731). At around the same time, Abeille was approached by the Estates of Burgundy who asked him to advise on the best route for a canal connecting the Saône and the Seine. In June 1724 he went to Pouilly-en-Auxois which would be the starting point for the Canal de Bourgogne (although it would be another half century before construction work would actually start, long after Abeille's death). In November 1724 the Estates of Burgundy commissioned him to organise the levelling necessary for the construction of the canal and produce a cost estimate for the work. Although it remains uncertain how far the project progressed at this stage, the report which Abeille prepared jointly with Jacques Gabriel, and which they presented to the Estates in 1727, was retained and has survived. In 1729, permission having been obtained to progress the project based on Abeille's plans, construction seemed likely to go ahead. However, the man given the necessary letters patent was Pierre-François Merchand d'Espinassy, who had actually favoured an alternative plan. There was a general falling out soon after which Pierre-François Merchand d'Espinassy. The authorities had been appalled by the cost estimate, and the project progressed no further at this stage.

In 1763 the project was relaunched by a new generation of politicians, however, who prepared to construct the Canal de Bourgogne, using the existing plans which were now more than thirty years old. Joseph Abeille was by now dead, and his son-in-law, the soldier-intellectual Louis-Félix Guinement de Kéralio, found it necessary to launch a court case in order to ensure that Abeille's "paternity role" in respect of the canal was acknowledged. A decree issued by the king's Council of State dated 20 July 1764 confirms that the plaintiff received satisfaction on all counts, on behalf of his wife's late father. This amounted to a confirmation that the king required that Abeille's plans were the ones to be implemented in preference to any others that might be put forward.

=== Brittany ===
In 1730 Joseph Abeille was back in Brittany where he researched the construction of a canal from the regional capital, Rennes, to the northern coast at Dinan and Saint-Malo. The route proposed involved making extensive use of the River Ille, much of which would need to be channelled in order to make it navigable. It was presumably primarily for financial reasons that this turned out to be no more than one in a series of abandoned projects. When the canal was built during the first part of the nineteenth century it did indeed follow the route proposed in Abeille's 1730 study (though the topography of the region makes it hard to see how any other route could reasonably have been contemplated).

On 23 May 1730 his former partner, Jacques Gabriel, appointed Joseph Abeille to fill a vacancy that had just arisen (following a disagreement involving Pierre Le Mousseux, the previous incumbent) for a chief architect to implement the reconstruction programme which was under way in Rennes following the fire which had destroyed the city centre between 23 December and 29 December in 1720. (Gabriel, who was well networked at court, had been appointed to take charge of the reconstruction by the king some years earlier.)

=== Bern ===
In 1732 Abeille accepted an invitation which involved returning to Switzerland. This time the invitation came from Bern where he was contracted to produce plans for a new Public Hospital ("Burgerspital" / Hôpital des bourgeois). This time his plans were implemented, the large hospital being constructed between 1734 and 1742: nearly three hundred years later in full splendour, notwithstanding a recent renovation and conversion exercise. On this occasion he spent a further three years in Switzerland, undertaking commissions not just in Bern, but also in Morges, where he implemented major improvements to the port, and Solothurn, where his plans for a new bridge over the Aare, failed to progress, but hospital and church buildings that he designed were constructed almost immediately, and had been largely completed by the time he went back to the west of France in 1735.

=== Nantes ===
In 1738 Abeille, at this time chief engineer for the south of Brittany, produced a study on ways to improve the navigability of the Loire in Nantes. On 29 September of that year he submitted a project on the Fish Market Bridge ("Pont de la Poissonnière") in Nantes. In 1740 he was engaged on a programme of extensive repairs to the still new Nantes stock exchange building, which was evidently much too heavy for the soft ground on which it had been positioned.

Although the reconstruction of Rennes would continue for many more years, by 1742 Joseph Abeille was no longer the chief architect overseeing it. Instead he served between 1742 and 1751 as city architect for Nantes. Here the developments for which he took charge included the reconstruction in 1743 of the Brancas river dock. In 1744 he contributed his export opinion concerning the Pirmil Bridge over the southern branch of the Loire, possibly hoping to be given the job of reconstructing it, but that seems not to have happened. The city authorities were evidently becoming increasingly reluctant to spend money on infrastructure development. Nevertheless, in 1749 he accepted a job that involved re constructing some of the wharfs of the Brancas river dock and redesigning the foundations and structure for the adjacent market hall proposed by the city architect. In 1751 Abeille was expressing dissatisfaction that he was required to work for a series of job specific fees rather than receiving a fixed salary for his work. He also complained at the small number of building workers assigned to the project by the contractors selected by the city authorities. Relations became progressively more strained, and later during 1751 Joseph Abeille withdrew from the Brancas project. The city authorities passed the job his son, Jean Saturnin Abeille-Fontaine, who was given a fixed annual salary and completed the work, based on the plans his father had submitted in 1750. Relations between Joseph Abeille and the city fathers now improved a little, but he was now nearly eighty years old, and there were no more significant projects.

By the time Joseph Abeille died, in 1756, he had evidently moved back to Rennes.

== Personal ==
Joseph Abeille's first marriage, possibly to Magdeleine Le Roy, was followed by the births of two children. His second marriage was formalised on 6 April 1717 in Toulouse. His bride, more than twenty years younger than he, was Madeleine de Labat: the marriage produced at least four and possibly as many as seven children between 1719 and 1727, including Françoise Abeille de Keralio.
