= List of painters by name beginning with "K" =

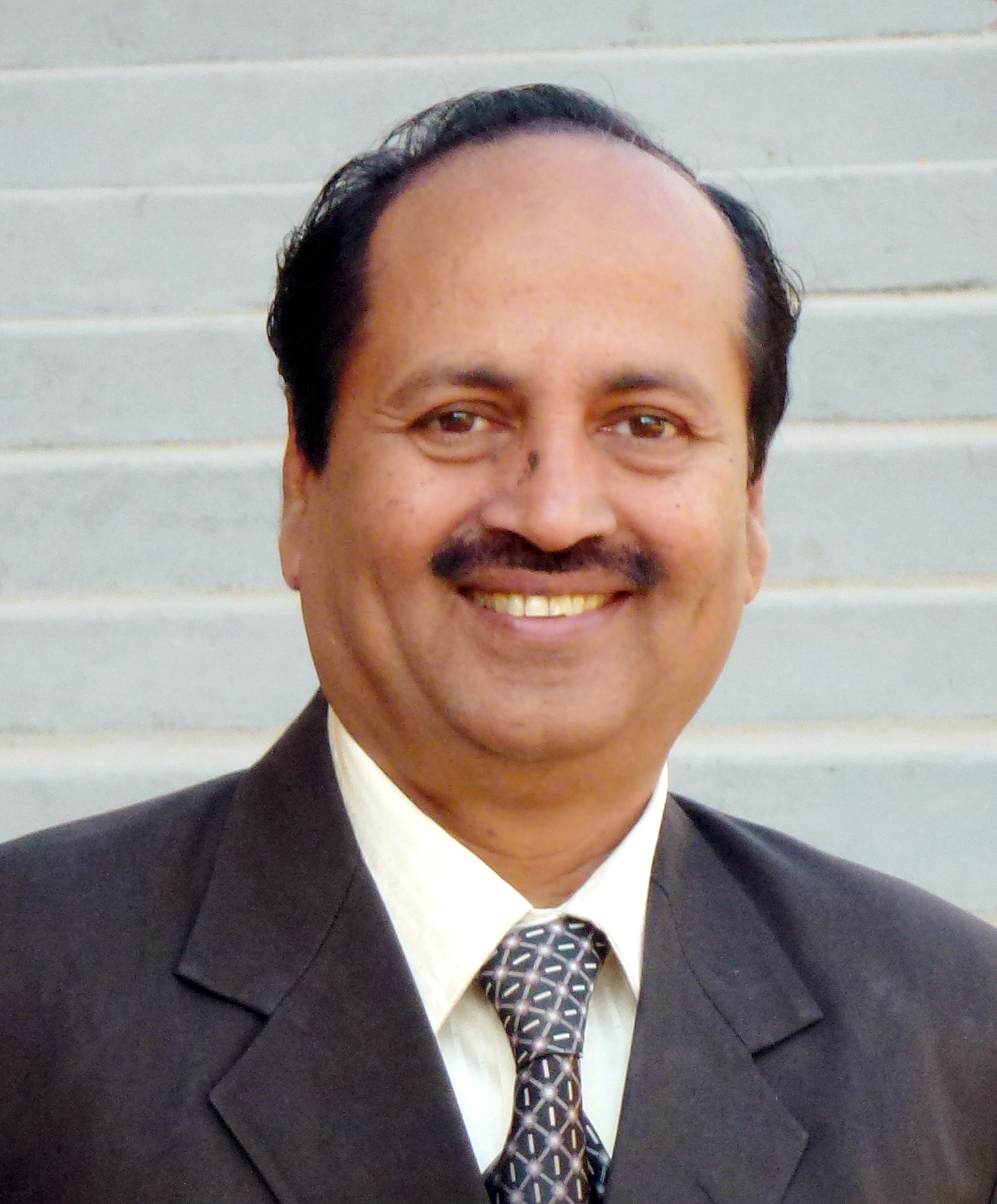
Kailash Chandra Meher

Please add names of notable painters with a Wikipedia page, in precise English alphabetical order, using U.S. spelling conventions. Country and regional names refer to where painters worked for long periods, not to personal allegiances.

- Kaburagi Kiyokata (鏑木清方, 1878–1972), Japanese nihonga artist
- Ingrida Kadaka (born 1967), Latvian artist, book designer and illustrator
- Charles S. Kaelin (1858–1929), American painter
- Frida Kahlo (1907–1954), Mexican painter
- Wolf Kahn (1927–2020), American painter
- Kaigetsudō Anchi (壊月堂安知, c. 1700–1716), Japanese ukiyo-e artist
- Kaigetsudō Ando (壊月堂安度, c. 1671–1743), Japanese ukiyo-e artist
- Kailash Chandra Meher (born 1954), Indian artist, inventor and social activist
- Jacob Kainen (1909–2001), American painter and print-maker
- Willem Kalf (1619–1693), Dutch painter
- Jitish Kallat (born 1974), Indian painter and multimedia artist
- Kamagurka (born 1956), Belgian painter, cartoonist and comedian
- Lev Lvovich Kamenev (1833–1886), Russian landscape painter
- Kamisaka Sekka (神坂雪佳, 1866–1942), Japanese artist and designer
- Kanbun Master (寛文大師, c. 1660–1673), Japanese woodblock printer
- Wassily Kandinsky (1866–1944), Russian/Soviet painter and art theorist
- Paul Kane (1810–1871), Canadian painter
- Rajmund Kanelba (1897–1960), Polish painter
- Kang Hŭian (강희안, c. 1417–1464), Korean painter and scholar
- Kang Sehwang (강세황, 1713–1791), Korean painter, calligrapher and government official
- Kanō Eitoku (狩野永徳, 1543–1590), Japanese painter
- Kanō Hōgai (狩野芳崖, 1828–1888), Japanese painter
- Kanō Masanobu (狩野正信, 1434–1530), Japanese painter
- Kanō Mitsunobu (狩野光信, 1565–1608), Japanese painter
- Kanō Motonobu (狩野元信, 1476–1559), Japanese painter
- Kanō Naizen (狩野内膳, 1570–1616), Japanese painter
- Kanō Sanraku (狩野山楽, 1559–1635), Japanese painter
- Kanō Sansetsu (狩野山雪, 1589–1651), Japanese painter
- Kanō Shōsenin (狩野勝川院, 1823–1880), Japanese painter
- Kanō Takanobu (狩野孝信, 1571–1618), Japanese painter
- Kanō Tan'yū (狩野探幽, 1602–1674), Japanese painter
- Kanō Tanshin (狩野探信, 1653–1718), Japanese painter
- Alexander Kanoldt (1881–1939), German painter
- Howard Kanovitz (1929–2009), American artist
- Nabil Kanso (born 1946), American painter
- Tadeusz Kantor (1915–1990), Polish painter and assemblage artist
- Leon Kapliński (1826–1873), Polish painter and activist
- Edmond Xavier Kapp (1890–1978), English painter, draftsman and caricaturist
- Bertalan Karlovszky (1858–1938), Hungarian painter
- Alfons Karpiński (1875–1961), Polish painter
- Nikolai Alekseyevich Kasatkin (1859–1930), Russian/Soviet painter
- Luigi Kasimir (1881–1962), Austrian painter, etcher and print-maker
- Vytautas Kasiulis (1918–1995), Lithuanian/French painter and print-maker
- János Kass (1927–2010), Hungarian illustrator, print-maker and film director
- Lajos Kassák (1887–1967), Hungarian painter, poet and writer
- Eizō Katō (加藤栄三, 1906–1972), Japanese nihonga painter
- Tōichi Katō (加藤東一, 1916–1996), Japanese nihonga painter
- Nándor Katona (1864–1932), Hungarian painter
- Katsukawa Shunchō (勝川春潮, fl. 1783–1795), Japanese ukiyo-e print-maker
- Katsukawa Shun'ei (勝川春英, 1762–1819), Japanese ukiyo-e print artist
- Katsukawa Shunkō I (勝川春好, 1743–1812), Japanese ukiyo-e print-maker
- Katsukawa Shunsen (勝川春扇, 1762 – c. 1830), Japanese ukiyo-e print and book designer
- Katsukawa Shunshō (勝川春章, 1726–1792), Japanese painter and print-maker
- Alex Katz (born 1927), American painter, sculptor and print-maker
- Hanns Katz (1892–1940), German painter and graphic artist
- Angelica Kauffman (1741–1807), Swiss/English painter
- Isidor Kaufman (1853–1921), Hungarian painter
- František Kaván (1866–1941), Austro-Hungarian/Czechoslovak painter and poet
- Kawabata Ryūshi (川端龍子, 1885–1966), Japanese painter
- Kawai Gyokudō (川合玉堂, 1873–1957), Japanese painter
- Kawanabe Kyōsai (河鍋暁斎, 1831–1889), Japanese painter
- Kawase Hasui (川瀬巴水, 1883–1957), Japanese print designer
- John Kay (1742–1826), Scottish caricaturist and engraver
- Otis Kaye (1885–1974), American painter
- Ke Jiusi (柯九思, 1290–1343), Chinese painter, calligrapher and poet
- John Keane (born 1954), English painter
- Carl Eugen Keel (1885–1961), Swiss painter
- Adam Dario Keel (1924–2018), Swiss artist
- Keisai Eisen (渓斎英泉, 1790–1848), Japanese ukiyo-e print-maker
- Gusztáv Kelety (1834–1902), Hungarian painter
- Albert Keller (1844–1920), German painter
- Gerald Kelley (living), American children's book illustrator
- Ellsworth Kelly (1923–2015), American painter, sculptor and print-maker
- Gerald Kelly (1879–1972), English painter
- Jane Kelly (born 1956), English artist and journalist
- Paul Kelpe (1902–1985), German/American painter
- Jeka Kemp (1876–1966), Scottish painter and woodcut artist
- Richard Gordon Kendall (1933–2008), American artist
- Rockwell Kent (1882–1971), American painter, print-maker and writer
- Dóra Keresztes (born 1953), Hungarian painter, print-maker and film director
- Károly Kernstok (1873–1940), Hungarian painter
- Georg Friedrich Kersting (1785–1847), German painter
- Jan van Kessel the Younger (1654–1708), Flemish/Spanish painter
- Jan van Kessel the Elder (1626–1679), Flemish painter
- Morris Kestelman (1905–1998), English artist and art teacher
- Thomas de Keyser (1596–1667), Dutch painter and architect
- I Ketut Soki (born 1946), Indonesian (Balinese) artist
- Annabel Kidston (1896–1981), Scottish painter, etcher and illustrator
- Anselm Kiefer (born 1945), German painter and sculptor
- Michel Kikoine (1892–1968), Lithuanian/French painter
- Kikuchi Yōsai (菊池容斎, 1781–1878), Japanese painter
- Ada Gladys Killins (1901–1963), Canadian artist and educator
- Sarah Louisa Kilpack (1839–1909), English painter
- Kim Deuk-sin (김득신, 1754–1822), Korean court painter
- Kim Du-ryang (김두량, 1696–1763), Korean painter
- Kim Eung-hwan (김응환, 1742–1789), Korean royal painter
- Kim Hong-do (김홍도, 1745–1806) Korean royal painter
- Kim Hwan-gi (김환기, 1913–1974), Korean artist
- Kim Jeong-hui, (김정희, 1786–1856), Korean calligrapher and scholar
- Kim Myeong-guk, (김명국, born 1600), Korean painter
- Kim Tschang Yeul (김창열, 1929–2021), Korean/South Korean painter
- Charles Bird King (1785–1862), American artist
- Dorothy King (1907–1990), English artist, curator and teacher
- Jessie M. King (1875–1949), Scottish illustrator
- Eduardo Kingman (1913–1998), Ecuadorian artist
- Thomas Kinkade (1958–2012), American painter
- Alison Kinnaird (born 1949), Scottish glass sculptor, musician and writer
- Jan Kip (1653–1722), Dutch/English draftsman and engraver
- Ernst Ludwig Kirchner (1880–1938), German painter and print-maker
- Raphael Kirchner (1867–1917), Austrian painter and illustrator
- Per Kirkeby (1938–2018), Danish painter, sculptor and poet
- Ryūsei Kishida, (岸田劉生, 1891–1929), Japanese painter
- Károly Kisfaludy (1788–1830), Hungarian artist and dramatist
- Moïse Kisling (1891–1953), French/American painter
- Bálint Kiss (1802–1868), Hungarian painter
- Herbert Kisza (born 1943), Czech painter and sculptor
- Kitagawa Utamaro (喜多川歌麿, 1753–1806), Japanese ukiyo-e print-maker and painter
- R. B. Kitaj (1932–2007), American/English artist
- Kiyohara Tama (清原玉, 1861–1939), Japanese/Italian painter
- Roar Kjernstad (born 1975), Norwegian painter
- Konrad Klapheck (1935–2023), German painter and graphic artist
- Mati Klarwein (1932–2002), German painter
- Paul Klee (1879–1940), Swiss/German artist
- Yves Klein (1928–1962), French artist
- Joseph Kleitsch (1885–1931), Hungarian/American painter
- Heinrich Kley (1863–1945), German illustrator and painter
- Karel Klíč (1841–1926), Austro-Hungarian/Czechoslovak artist and illustrator
- Gustav Klimt (1862–1918), Austrian painter
- Franz Kline (1910–1962), American painter
- Julius Klinger (1876–1942), Austrian painter, illustrator and writer
- Max Klinger (1857–1920), German painter, print-maker and writer
- Hilma af Klint (1862–1944), Swedish artist and mystic
- Juraj Julije Klović (1498–1578), Croatian/Italian illuminator, miniaturist and painter
- Michael Kmit (1910–1981), Ukrainian Australian painter
- Ludwig Knaus (1829–1910), German painter
- Laura Knight (1877–1970), English painter, etcher and engraver
- Jesper Knudsen (born 1964), Danish painter
- Kobayashi Kiyochika (小林清親, 1847–1915), Japanese ukiyo-e print-maker
- Martin Kober (1550–1598), Central European court painter
- Ivana Kobilca (1861–1962), Austro-Hungarian (Slovene)/Yugoslav painter
- Christen Købke (1810–1848), Danish painter
- Aleksander Kobzdej (1920–1972), Polish painter
- Max Friedrich Koch (1859–1930), German painter, art professor and photographer
- Ibrahim Kodra (1918–2006), Albanian/Italian painter
- Robert Koehler (1850–1917), German/American painter and art teacher
- Narashige Koide (小出楢重, 1887–1931), Japanese painter and illustrator
- Ryōhei Koiso (小磯良平, 1903–1988), Japanese artist
- Junsaku Koizumi (小泉淳作, 1924–2012), Japanese painter and pottery artist
- Oskar Kokoschka (1886–1980), Austrian artist, poet and playwright
- Andrei Kolkoutine (born 1957), Russian painter and sculptor
- Rudolf Koller (1828–1905), Swiss painter
- Käthe Kollwitz (1867–1945), German painter, print-maker and sculptor
- Ludwik Konarzewski (1885–1954), Polish painter, sculptor and art teacher
- Ludwik Konarzewski Jr (1918–1989), Polish painter, sculptor and art teacher
- Jan Konůpek (1883–1950), Austro-Hungarian/Czechoslovak painter, illustrator and engraver
- Béla Kondor (1931–1972), Hungarian painter, writer and poet
- Jacob Koninck (c. 1615 – c. 1695), Dutch painter
- Philips Koninck (1619–1688), Dutch painter
- Salomon Koninck (1609–1656), Dutch painter and engraver
- Kōno Michisei (1895–1950), Japanese painter, illustrator and print-maker
- Willem de Kooning (1904–1997), American Abstract Expressionist artist
- Jeff Koons (born 1955), American artist and sculptor
- Frans Koppelaar (born 1943), Dutch painter
- Jaroslava Korol (1954–2009), Soviet/Ukrainian painter
- Aladár Körösfői-Kriesch (1863–1920), Hungarian painter
- Konstantin Korovin (1861–1939), Russian/French painter
- Koryusai Isoda (礒田湖龍斎, 1735–1790), Japanese print designer and painter
- Kose Kanaoka (巨勢金岡, 9th c.), Japanese court painter
- Jerzy Kossak (1886–1955), Polish painter
- Juliusz Kossak (1824–1899), Polish painter and illustrator
- Wojciech Kossak (1857–1942), Polish painter
- Franciszek Kostrzewski (1826–1911), Polish illustrator, cartoonist and painter
- József Koszta (1861–1949), Hungarian painter
- Albert Kotin (1907–1980), American artist
- Aleksander Kotsis (1836–1877), Polish painter
- Ivan Kramskoi (1837–1887), Russian painter and art critic
- Andre de Krayewski (1933–2018), Polish/American artist
- Albert Henry Krehbiel (1873–1945), American painter
- Jürg Kreienbühl (1932–2007), Swiss/French painter
- Kristian Kreković (1901–1985), Yugoslav/Croatian painter and ethnographer
- Pinchus Kremegne (1890–1981), Lithuanian/French sculptor, painter and lithographer
- Christian Krohg (1852–1925), Norwegian painter, illustrator and author
- Per Krohg (1889–1965), Norwegian artist
- Leon Kroll (1884–1974), American painter and lithographer
- Julius Kronberg, Swedish Painter
- Peder Severin Krøyer (1851–1909), Danish painter
- Marie Krøyer (1867–1940), Danish painter
- Mārtiņš Krūmiņš (1900–1992), Latvian/American painter
- Alfred Krupa (1915–1989), Yugoslav (Croatian) painter
- Martina Krupičková (born 1975), Czechoslovak/Czech painter
- Izidor Kršnjavi (1845–1927), Austro-Hungarian (Croatian)/Yugoslav painter, art historian and politician
- Konrad Krzyżanowski (1872–1922), Polish (Ukrainian) illustrator and painter
- Otakar Kubín (1883–1969), Austro-Hungarian (Czech)/French painter and sculptor
- Bohumil Kubista (1884–1918), Austro-Hungarian (Czech) painter and art critic
- Alexander Kucharsky (1741–1819), Polish/French painter
- Arkhip Kuindzhi (1847–1910), Russian painter
- Igor Kufayev (born 1966) Russian/English artist and spiritual teacher
- Kume Keiichiro (1866–1934), Japanese yōga painter
- Kun Can (髡殘, 1612 – post-1674), Chinese painter
- Yasuo Kuniyoshi (国吉康雄, 1893–1953), Japanese/American painter, photographer and print-maker
- Jan Kupecký (1667–1740), Bohemian (Czech)/Hungarian painter
- František Kupka (1871–1957), Austro-Hungarian/Czechoslovak painter and graphic artist
- Alexander V. Kuprin (1880–1960), Russian/Soviet painter
- Kuroda Seiki (黒田清輝, 1866–1924), Japanese painter and teacher
- Yayoi Kusama (草間彌生, 1929–2026), Japanese sculptor, painter and writer
- Boris Kustodiev (1878–1927), Russian/Soviet painter and stage designer
- Kusumi Morikage (久隅守景, 1620–1690), Japanese painter
- Vilhelm Kyhn (1819–1903), Danish painter
