= Kohno =

Kohno may refer to:

- 5113 Kohno, a main-belt asteroid, named after Japanese luthier Masaru Kohno (1926 - 1998), a famous builder who specialized in making classical guitars.
- Kohno Michisei (1895–1950), a Japanese painter, illustrator, and printmaker
- Ryuji Kohno, a Japanese engineer
- Shunsuke Kohno, Japanese driver
- Tadayoshi Kohno
