= Chotěbuz =

Chotěbuz Kocobędz
- Municipality
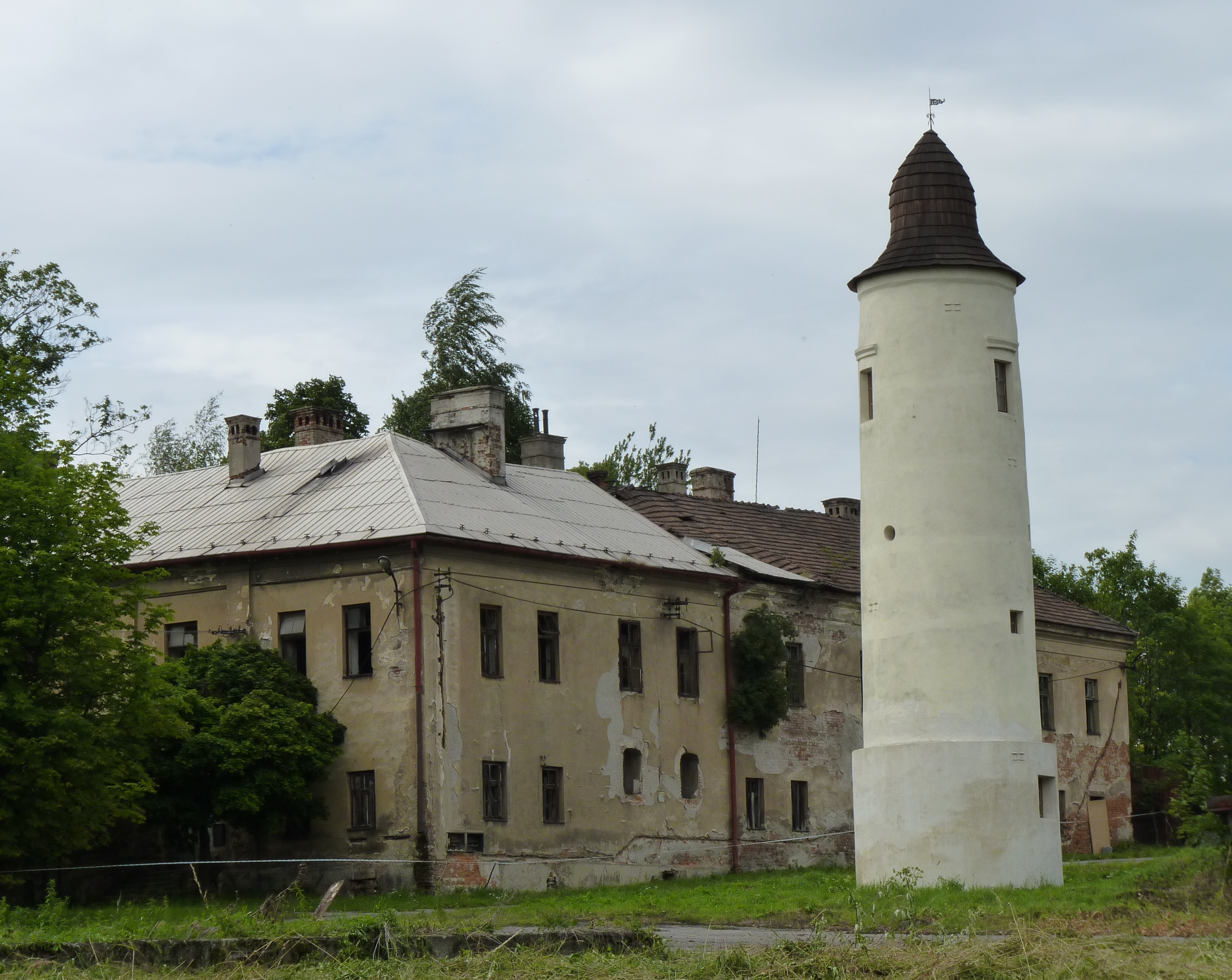
- Chotěbuz Castle

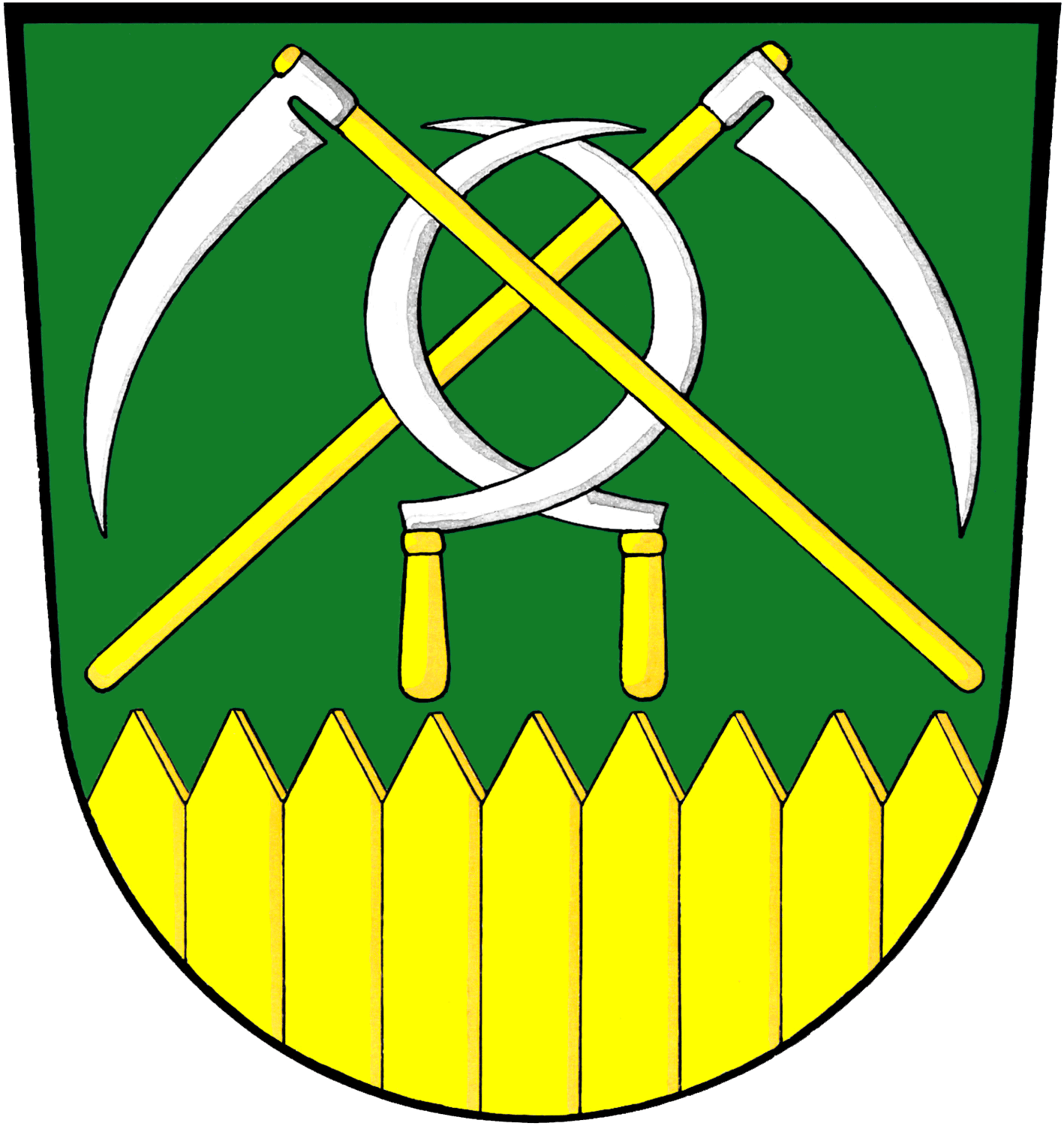
- Flag Coat of arms

- Location in the Czech Republic
- Coordinates: 49°46′7″N 18°34′9″E
- Country: Czech Republic
- Region: Moravian-Silesian
- District: Karviná
- First mentioned: 1229

Area
  - Total: 10.61 km^{2} (4.10 sq mi)
- Elevation: 330 m (1,080 ft)

Population (2026-01-01)
  - Total: 1,412
  - Density: 133.1/km^{2} (344.7/sq mi)
- Time zone: UTC+1 (CET)
  - Summer (DST): UTC+2 (CEST)
- Postal code: 735 61
- Website: www.chotebuz.cz

Chotěbuz (Polish: Kocobędz, German: Kotzobendz) is a municipality and village in Karviná District in the Moravian-Silesian Region of the Czech Republic. It has about 1,400 inhabitants. The municipality has a significant Polish minority.

== Etymology ==
The name of Chotěbuz is derived from the old Slavic personal name Chotěbud (in Czech) / Kocobąd or Chociebąd (in Polish). The name originally meant "Chotěbud's castle".

== Geography ==
Chotěbuz is located about 9 kilometres (6 mi) south of Karviná and 20 km (12 mi) east of Ostrava. It lies on the border with Poland in the historical region of Cieszyn Silesia. The municipality is located in the Moravian-Silesian Foothills, on the left bank of the Olza River. The highest point is the hill Potůčky at 346 m (1,135 ft) above sea level.

== History ==
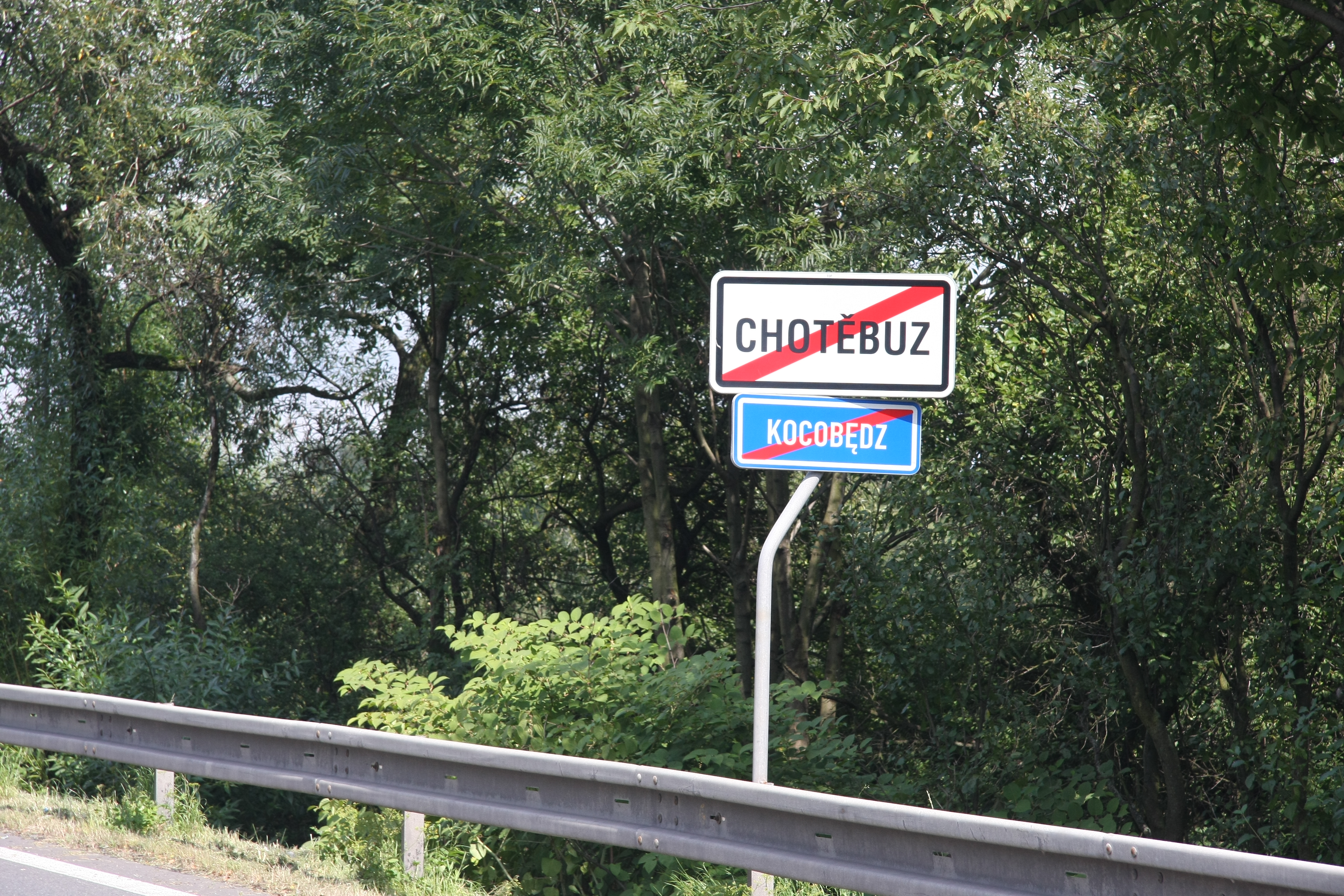
Bilingual signs at village limits

Chotěbuz is one of the oldest villages in Cieszyn Silesia. There was a Slavic fortified settlement – gord. It was an important centre since the 8th century. At the beginning of the 11th century, people abandoned the gord and founded a new castle and town on a promontory above the Olza, known as Cieszyn. Near the old place a new settlement was established, called Podobora.

Chotěbuz was first mentioned in the document of Pope Gregory IX issued in 1229 among villages belonging to Benedictine abbey in Tyniec, as Koczobontz. In 1268 it was bestowed by Władysław Opolski to the newly established Benedictine abbey in Orlová.

Politically it belonged then to the Duchy of Opole and Racibórz and Castellany of Cieszyn, which was in 1290 formed in the process of feudal fragmentation of Poland and was ruled by a local branch of Piast dynasty. In 1327 the duchy became a fee of the Kingdom of Bohemia, which after 1526 became part of the Habsburg monarchy.

From 1447, Chotěbuz was a part of the Fryštát estate. In 1559, Chotěbuz was acquired by Václav Rucký of Rudz, who had built here a small fortress.

After Revolutions of 1848 in the Austrian Empire a modern municipal division was introduced in the re-established Austrian Silesia. Chotěbuz as a municipality was subscribed to the political and legal district of Cieszyn. According to the censuses conducted in 1880–1910 the population of the municipality grew from 975 in 1880 to 1,173 in 1910 with a majority being native Polish-speakers (between 95.1% and 97.1%) accompanied by a small German-speaking minority (at most 39 or 3.4% in 1910) and Czech-speaking (at most 17 or 1.5% in 1910). In terms of religion in 1910 majority were Protestants (52.6%), followed by Roman Catholics (46.8%).

After World War I, Polish–Czechoslovak War and the division of Cieszyn Silesia in 1920, it became a part of Czechoslovakia. Following the Munich Agreement, in October 1938 together with the Trans-Olza region it was annexed by Poland, administratively adjoined to Cieszyn County of Silesian Voivodeship. It was then annexed by Nazi Germany at the beginning of World War II. After the war, it was restored to Czechoslovakia.

Until 1974, Chotěbuz was an independent municipality. From 1974 to 1997, it was a municipal part of Český Těšín. Since 1998, it has been separate again.

== Demographics ==
According to the 2021 Census, Polish minority makes up 17.0% of the population.

Historical population

Year	Pop.	±%
1869	878	—
1880	975	+11.0%
1890	1,014	+4.0%
1900	1,016	+0.2%
1910	1,173	+15.5%

Year	Pop.	±%
1921	1,364	+16.3%
1930	1,539	+12.8%
1950	1,377	−10.5%
1961	1,240	−9.9%
1970	1,113	−10.2%

Year	Pop.	±%
1980	1,234	+10.9%
1991	990	−19.8%
2001	1,033	+4.3%
2011	1,122	+8.6%
2021	1,329	+18.4%

Source: Censuses

== Transport ==
In the municipality is a border crossing with Poland Chotěbuz / Boguszowice, one of the most frequented in the country and the largest between the Czech Republic and Poland. It is connected with the Polish one by a long bridge built in 1991 running over the Olza River.

The border crossing is located on the D48 motorway that ends here. Other main roads, which runs through the municipal territory, are the I/67 road from Český Těšín to Bohumín and briefly the I/11 road (the section from Ostrava to Český Těšín).

Chotěbuz is located on the railway line heading from Ostrava to Český Těšín and further to Mosty u Jablunkova.

== Sights ==
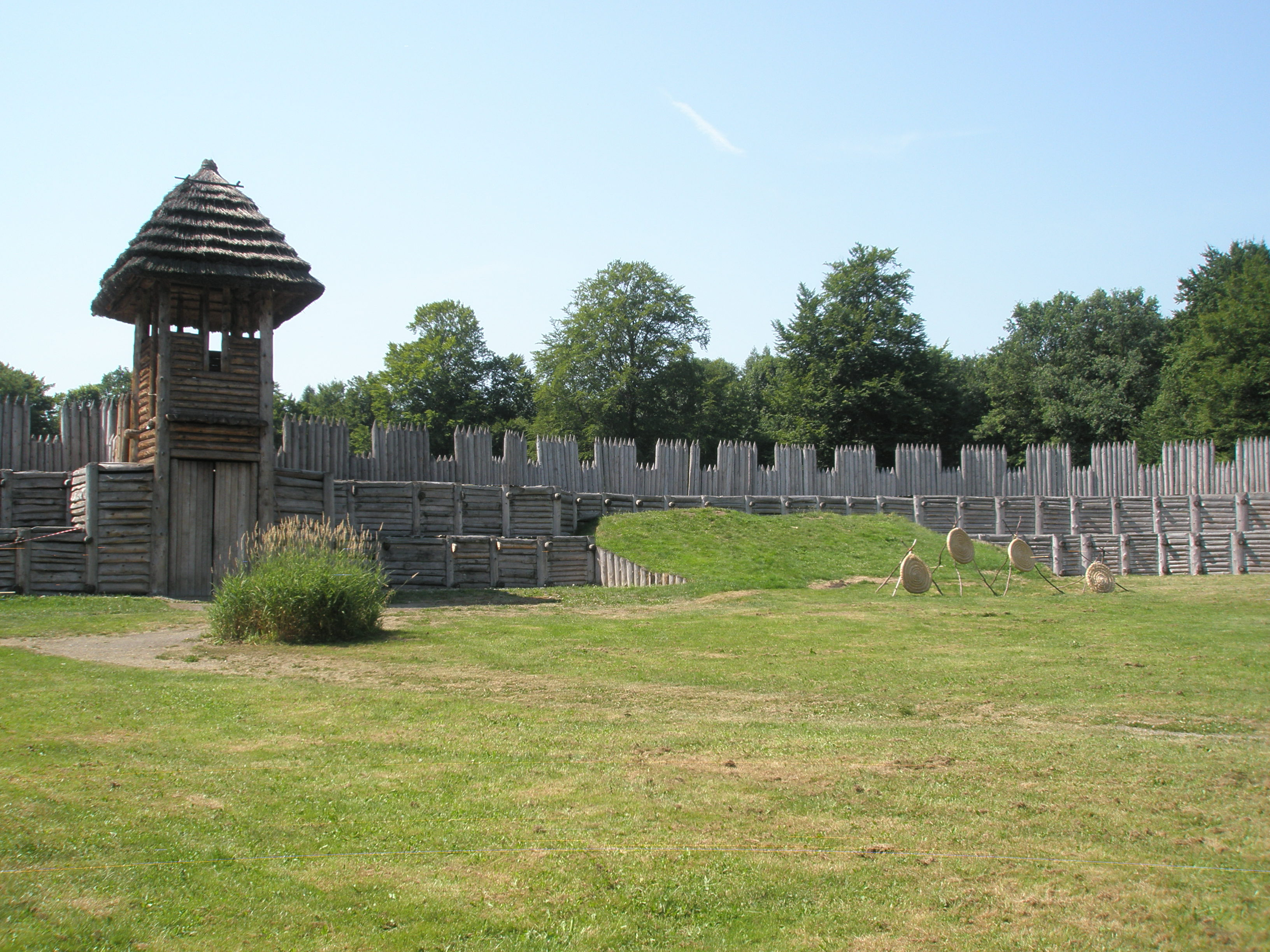
Podobora Archeopark

Podobora is today an archaeological site which was partly rebuilt to form an archeopark open to the public.

A keep is the last remnant of an old Gothic fortress which stood here in the 13th and 14th centuries. Window openings in the tower and roof are from the 19th century.

In the vicinity of the keep is the Chotěbuz Castle. It was originally built in the 16th century and completely rebuilt in 1875–1879. It was again renovated in 1947 and has partially lost its historical character. Nowadays the building is empty and dilapidated.

== Notable people ==
- Herbert Kisza (born 1943), painter and sculptor
