= Boguszowice =

Boguszowice may refer to the following places in Poland:

- Boguszowice, Cieszyn in Silesian Voivodeship (south Poland);
- Boguszowice, former town in Silesian Voivodeship (south Poland), now two districts of Rybnik:
  - Boguszowice Osiedle
  - Boguszowice Stare
