= Kanbun Master =

Early ukiyo-e artist

The Kanbun Master (Japanese: 寛文大師; fl. c. 1660–1673) was a Japanese woodblock print artist and mentor to Hishikawa Moronobu, who is generally considered to have founded the genre known as ukiyo-e. As no signed works by the Kanbun Master are known to survive (or to have ever been made), he remains anonymous and known only by the pseudonym assigned him by scholar Richard Lane on account of his having flourished during the Kanbun era (1661–1673) on the Japanese Imperial calendar.

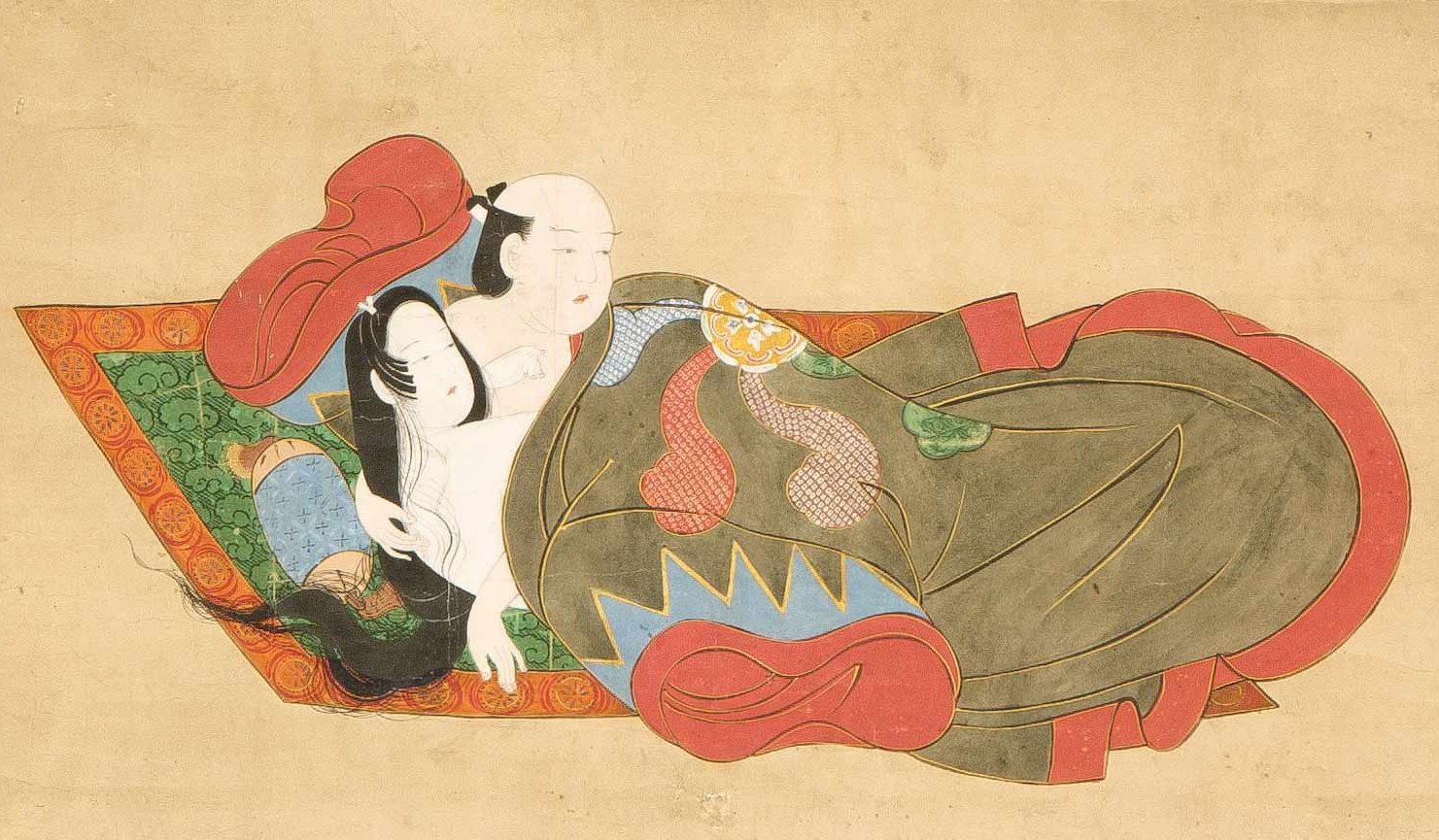
Lovers Surprised, painting by the Kanbun Master, late 1660s, Honolulu Museum of Art

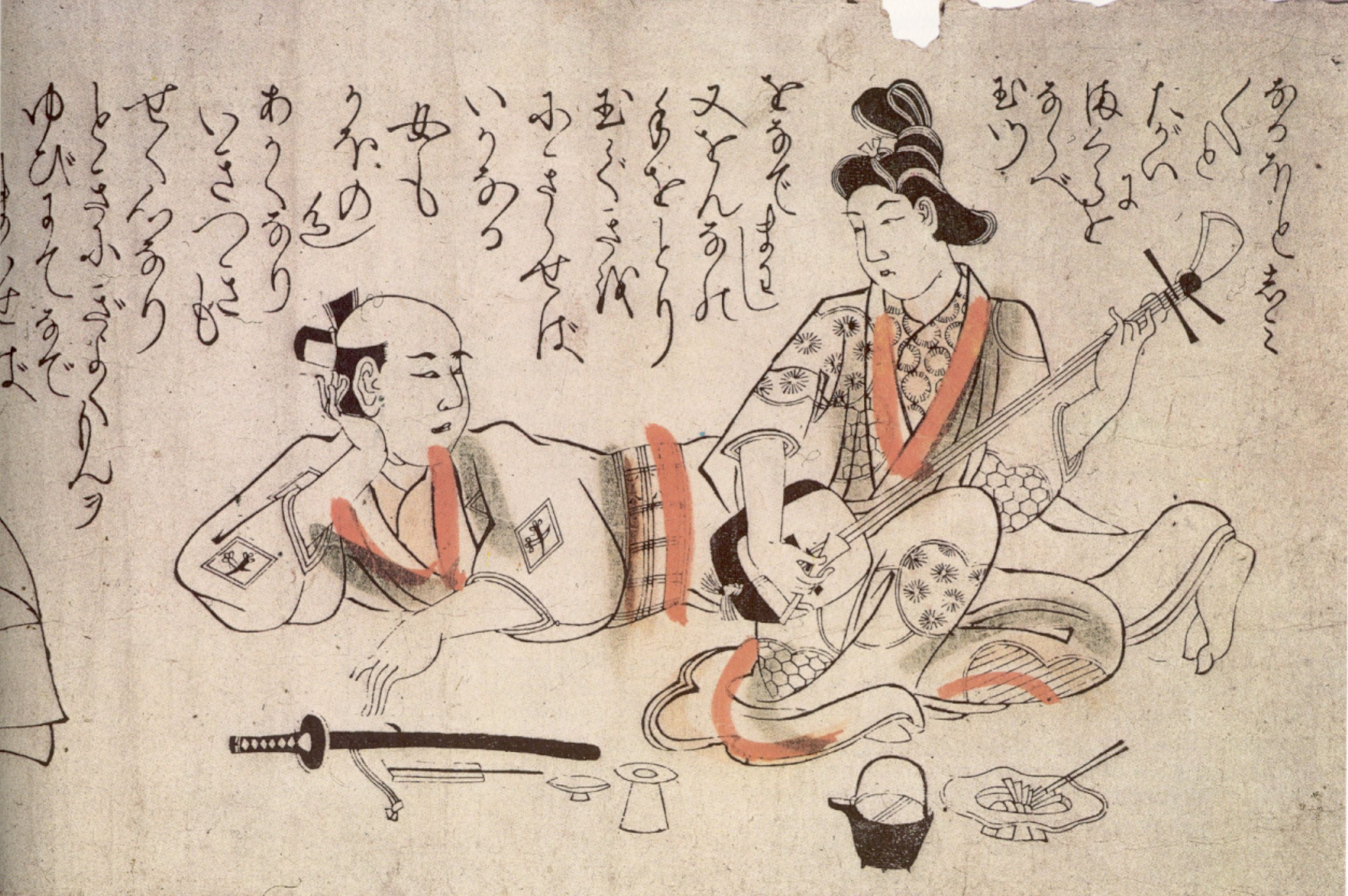
Courtesan and Lover, hand colored woodblock print of chūban size by the Kanbun Master, c. 1660

The precise relationship between the Master and Moronobu is unclear, and there are a number of works attributed to each which may have actually been created by the other, or yet another artist. As so little is known about the Master, is it not even clear whether or not he had any direct relationship with Moronobu at all, or if the latter was simply influenced by the Master's work. In fact, scholars are not even sure whether the works attributed to the Kanbun Master were even by a single hand, or if they were created by a greater number of anonymous artists.

Roughly fifty illustrated books are attributed to the Kanbun Master, including a number of shunga works, novels, guidebooks, poetry anthologies, jōruri plays, and courtesan critiques (yūjo hyōbanki). The Master also produced a number of paintings, and some of the first single-sheet (i.e. not bound into an illustrated book) woodblock printed images. The majority of these works were in the shunga (erotic pictures) mode, and all except the paintings were done in monochrome black ink, with a minimum of color added by hand.

His style is described as "powerful, almost primitive, yet features a dramatic intensity of depiction that was to influence and sustain ukiyo-e for many decades to come." His chief influence was the genre painting popular at the time, consisting primarily of scenes of daily activities in Japan's major cities, particularly Kyoto and Edo.

== See also ==
- Sugimura Jihei
