= Sugimura Jihei =

Japanese printmaker from 1681 to 1703

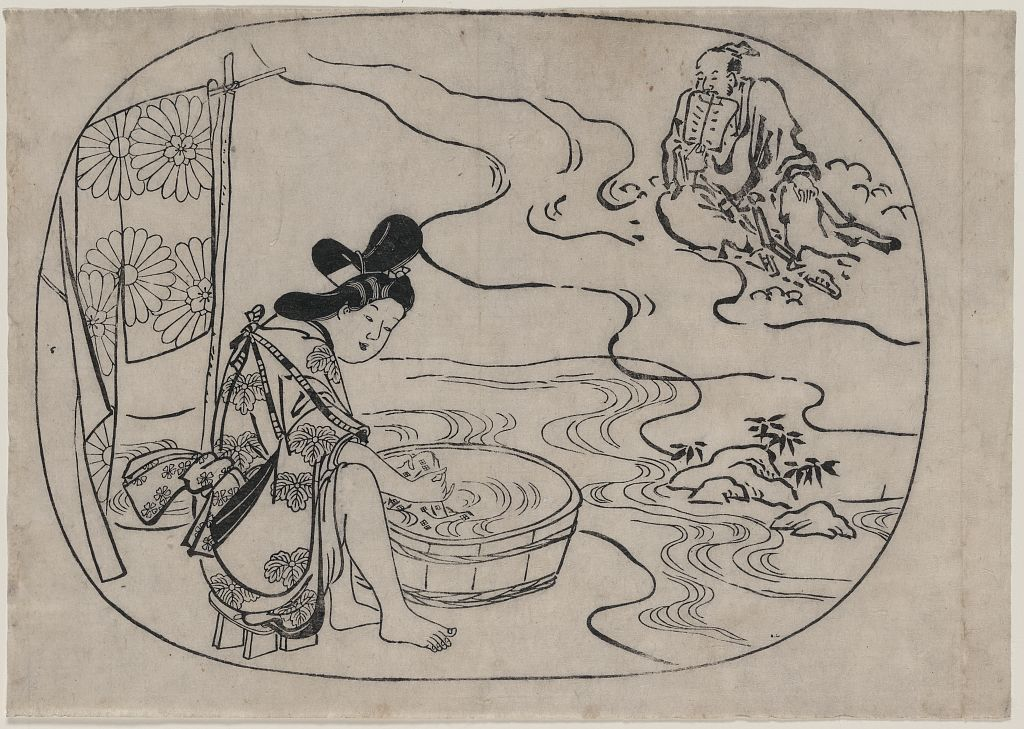
"The Daoist sage Kume" (Kume no sennin), an ukiyo-e print from the late 17th century, attributed to Sugimura Jihei.

Sugimura Jihei (杉村 治平) was a Japanese ukiyo-e printmaker who flourished from approximately 1681 to 1703.

== Confusion around attributions ==
According to art historian and ukiyo-e collector Richard Lane, Sugimura should be as an “indirect pupil” of Hishikawa Moronobu. Much of Sugimura's work was once attributed to fellow followers of Moronobu, or to Moronobu himself. In the 1920s, however, unsigned prints were discovered to have hidden signatures of Sugimura's incorporated in the drawing of the clothing folds. It appears Sugimura preferred (unlike most ukiyo-e artists) to sign with his surname rather than his given name.

There are few contemporary texts with information on Sugimura. The earliest mention of him can be found in a directory of Edo artists from 1689, the Edo Zukan Kompuku, where he is listed with his name and address as “Woodblock Artist, Sugimura Jihei Masataka, Tori-Aburacho.” Ryutei Tanahiko's Yoshabako, published in 1841, also credits Sugimura as illustrator of two books which are not known to be extant. The Edo Zukan Kompuku was compiled by Ishikawa Tomonobu, a cartographer, writer of popular fiction, print artist and illustrator, while Ryūtei Tanehiko was a gesaku writer best known for the novel Nise Murasaki Inaka Genji (1828), which reworked themes from The Tale of Genji.

== Works ==
Sugimura illustrated at least 70 books, and created a number of large size prints along with many of the more standard sizes and formats. Judging from his extant works, it appears that Sugimura specialized in shunga, or erotic prints. Shunga prints make up two-thirds of his work. Sugimura's work is characterized by sensual charm and soft, hand-colored, watercolor renderings in sumizuri-e. Some scholars judge his personal flamboyant and decorative style to be even more erotic than that of Hishikawa Moronobu. His subtle style and break away from his contemporary Moronobu's bold, black lines influenced later ukiyo-e artists to place more emphasis on color.

A distinguishing characteristic of his book illustrations are literary mitate-e, or allusions to literature, unlike Moronobu's illustrations which usually featured purely artistic motifs instead. Among the few ehon clearly attributed to Sugimura is Ikusa Kado-ide no Tawamure, an erotic work of 1687.

Also, it appears Sugimura preferred individual prints or album sheets as opposed to his mentor's bound book illustrations. The earliest signed kakemono-e, circa the late 1680s, is attributed to Sugimura.

Though the known works of Sugimura Jihei are mostly shunga, he also created an ukiyo-e depiction based on a chapter of The Tale of Genji. His work, Kashiwagi to Onna San no Miya ("Kashiwagi and the Third Princess"), is evocative of The Tale of Genji’s “Wakana jo” chapter.
