= Hishikawa Moronobu =

Japanese painter (1618–1694)

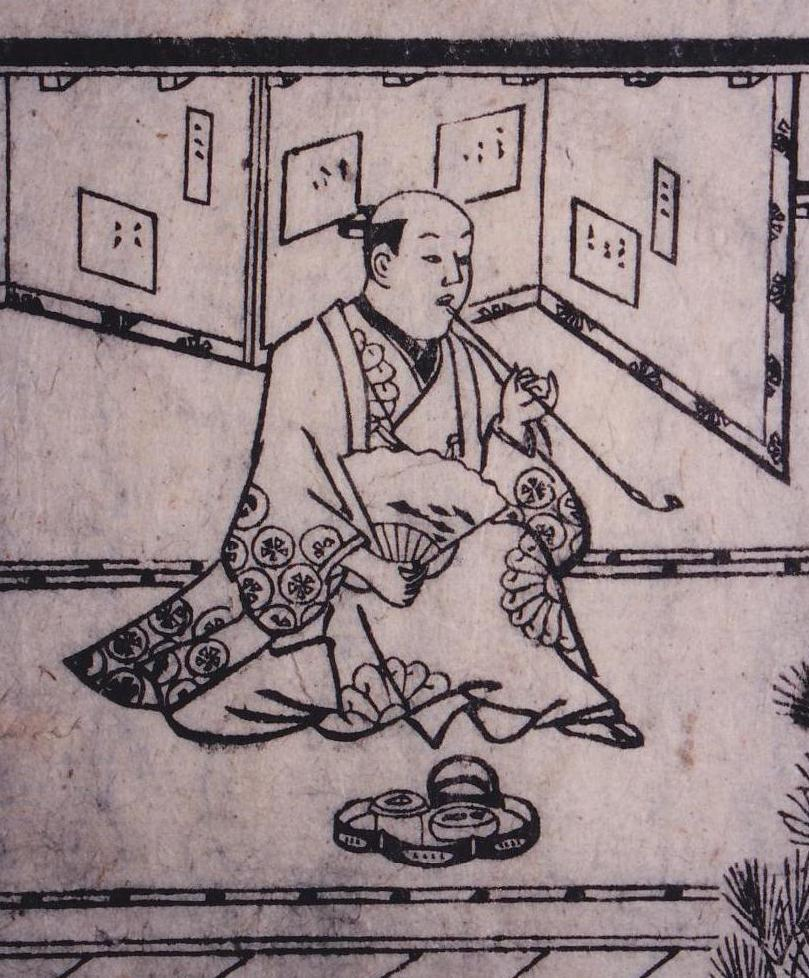
- Born: 1618; Hodomura, Kyonan, Awa Province, Japan
- Died: 25 July 1694 (aged 76); Edo, now Tokyo, Japan
- Known for: ukiyo-e

Hishikawa Moronobu (Japanese: 菱川 師宣; 1618 – 25 July 1694) was a Japanese artist known for popularizing the ukiyo-e genre of woodblock prints and paintings in the late 17th century. He consolidated the works of scattered Japanese art styles and forged the early development of ukiyo-e.

== Early life ==
Born in Hoda at the distant end of Edo Bay, Moronobu was the son of a well-respected embroiderer of rich tapestries who produced them for the use of temples and wealthy patrons. His initial works consisted designs for embroidery. After moving to Edo in the 1660s, Moronobu, who had likely learned skills from his father's craft, and studied both Tosa and Kanō-style painting. He thus had a solid grounding in both decorative crafts and academic painting, which served him well when he then turned to ukiyo-e, which he studied with his mentor, the Kanbun Master. Moronobu's surnames included both Hishikawa and Furuyama; his personal name in his early years was Kichibei, and he later adopted the art pseudonym Yūchiku.

== Work ==
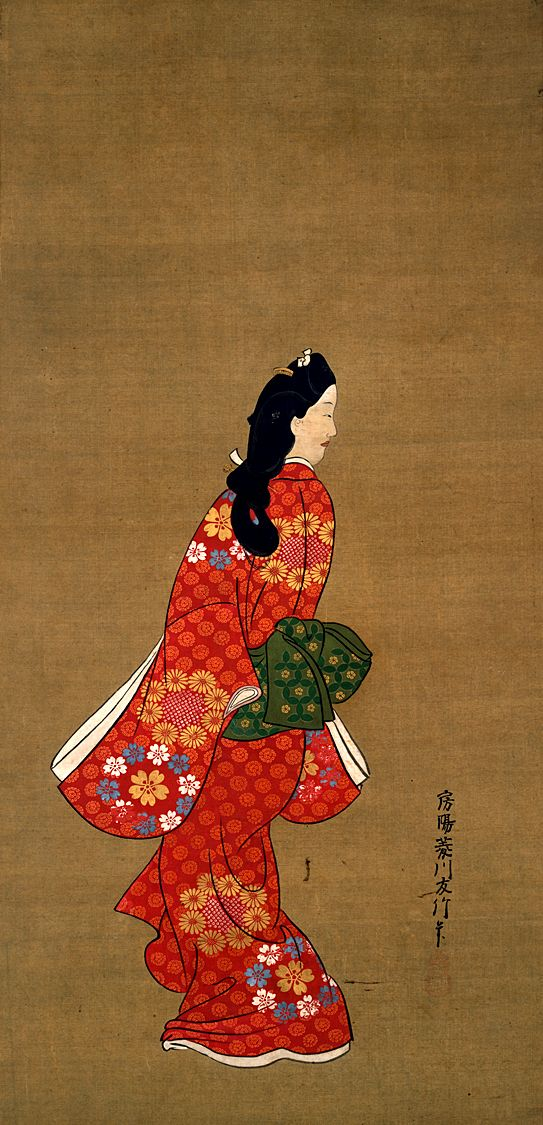
Beauty looking back. This painting was completed around the 17th century, depicting a beautiful woman wearing a kimono turning around. It was adopted as a stamp design around 1948 and became popular.

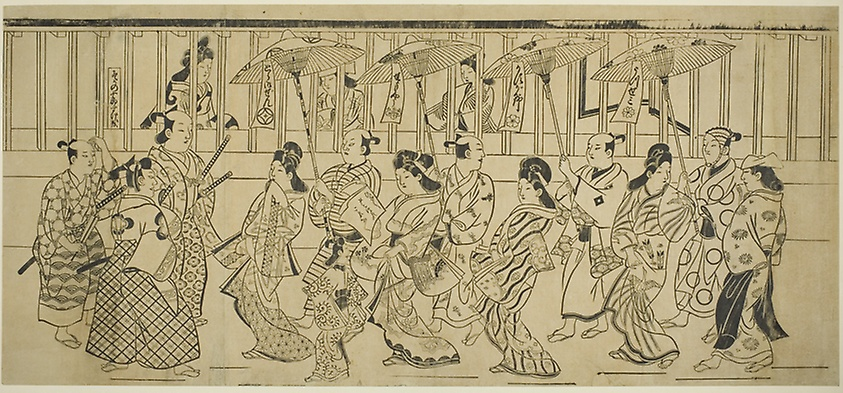
Courtesans parading with servants while holding umbrellas

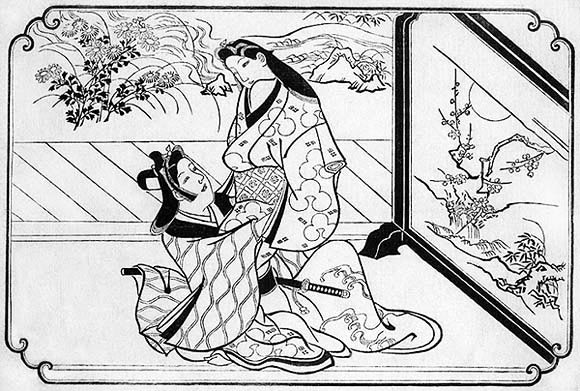
Panel from a series of 12, in abuna-e style Late 1670s–early 1680s; Hishikawa Moronobu (1618-1694); Woodcut, sumi ink on paper

The earliest known illustration of Moronobu that can be dated comes from his work titled One Hundred Warrior Poets from 1672, although earlier works may yet surface. By the mid-1670s Moronobu had already become the most important ukiyo-e printmaker, a position he maintained until his death. He produced more than 100 sets of illustrations, perhaps as many as 150, with around 20 being of an erotic nature. Though it is difficult to attribute to him many unsigned examples (for example, the scholar Kiyoshi Shibui established, in 1926, a basis for crediting some of the designs previously given to Moronobu as the work of Sugumura Jihei). Very few of Moronobu's single-sheet prints have survived, and most, if not all, are unsigned.

Moronobu assimilated inchoate ukiyo-e designs by previous artists, creating the first truly mature form of ukiyo-e, in a style of strength and presence that would set the standards for generations of artists who followed.

In 1685, the ukiyo-e book Kokon Bushidō ezukushi (古今武士道絵つくし, "Images of Bushidō Through the Ages") by Moronobu was published. It features heroic popular tales of samurai warriors with simple descriptions for each artwork. The title includes the word bushido and was meant for children, which shows that it had spread among the general population.

Despite his popularity with ukiyo-e prints, his illustrations found in collaborations with other artists and in printed books are what kicked off his career. In some cases Moronobu would take the images and subjects from other prints and illustrations made in Kyoto but would replace the images with his own illustrations to make them his own. A common subject Moronobu worked with was the depiction of women in their daily lives. He did this right up until the end of the 19th century, or in other words, the end of the Edo period. An example would be his contribution of illustrations for Hyankunin isshu zōsanshō (One Hundred Poets with Portraits and Commentaries). This publication produced an argument on whether it was designed for women or not. Moronobu's illustrations can also be found in The Pictorial Survey, drafted by Ochikochi Dōin. The images depicted include long military processions and travelers of all ages and stations. As he continued to do prints the subjects, scenes, colors, composition, and even his line work changed with adaptation of techniques and the audience that was interested in the current activities displayed.

Moronobu's work is held in numerous museum collections around the world, and in the Library of Congress.

== Gallery ==
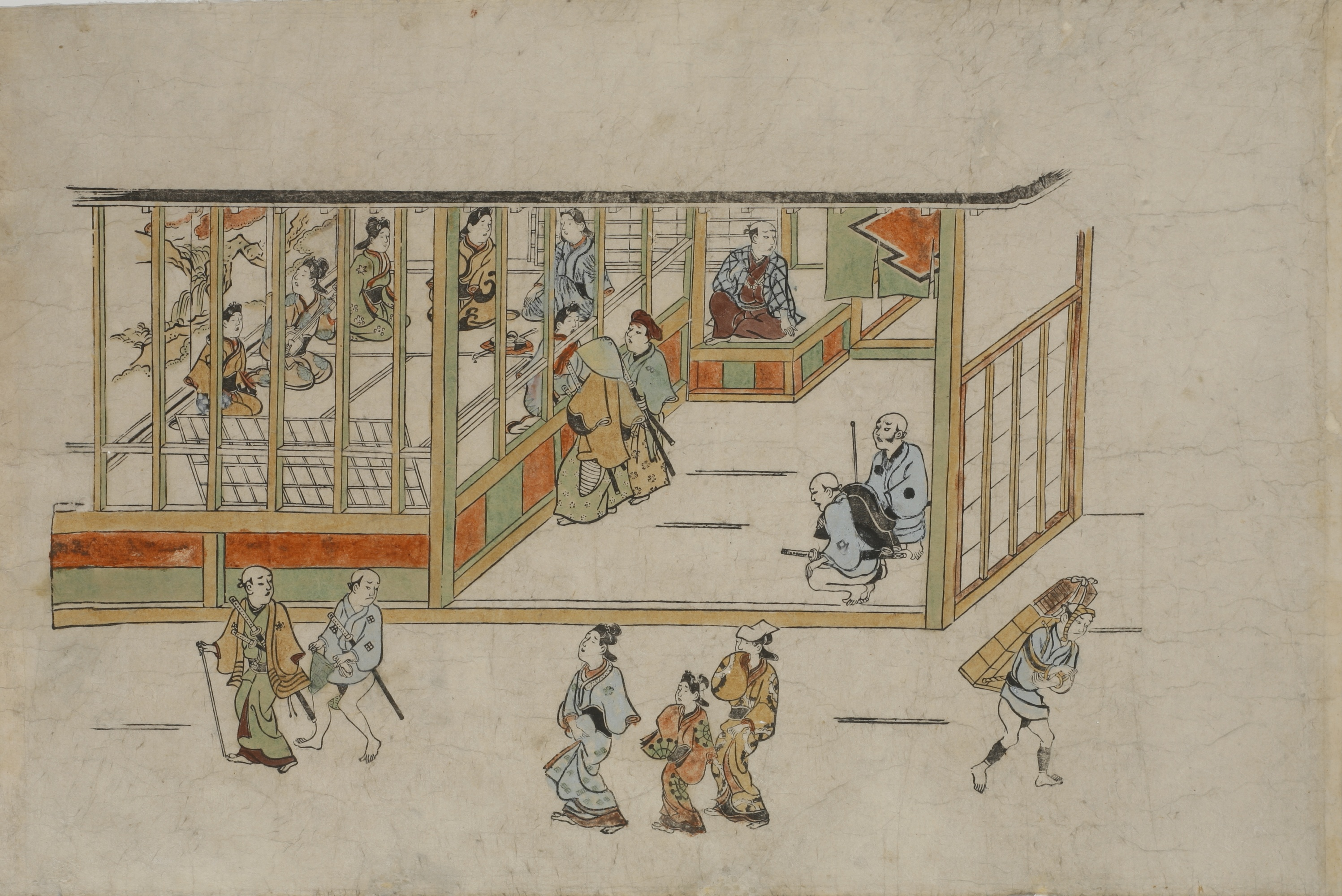
Lobby of a brothel from Yoshiwara no tei series, ca. 1680.

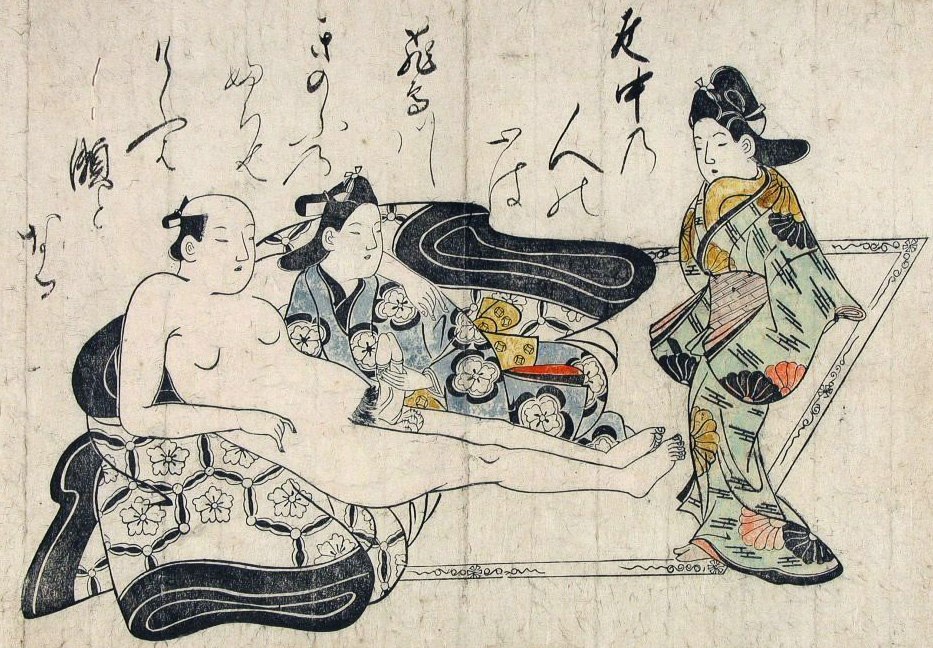
Shunga, early 1680s, private collection.

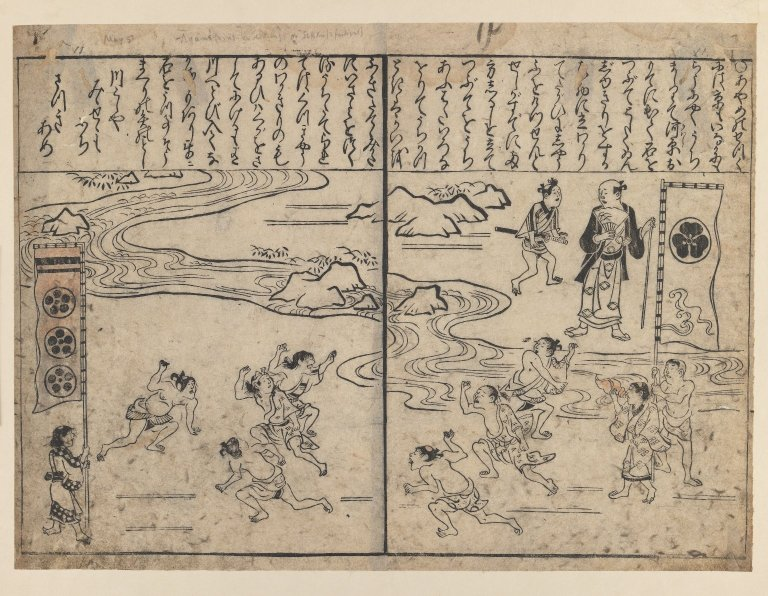
Ayame no Sikku, between 1650 and 1700, Brooklyn Museum.

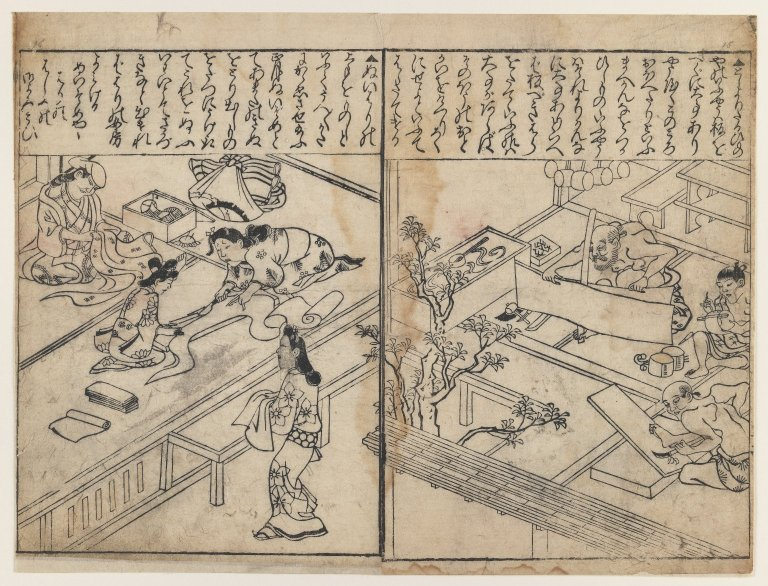
Women dressmaking and artisans at work, between 1675 and 1695, Brooklyn Museum.

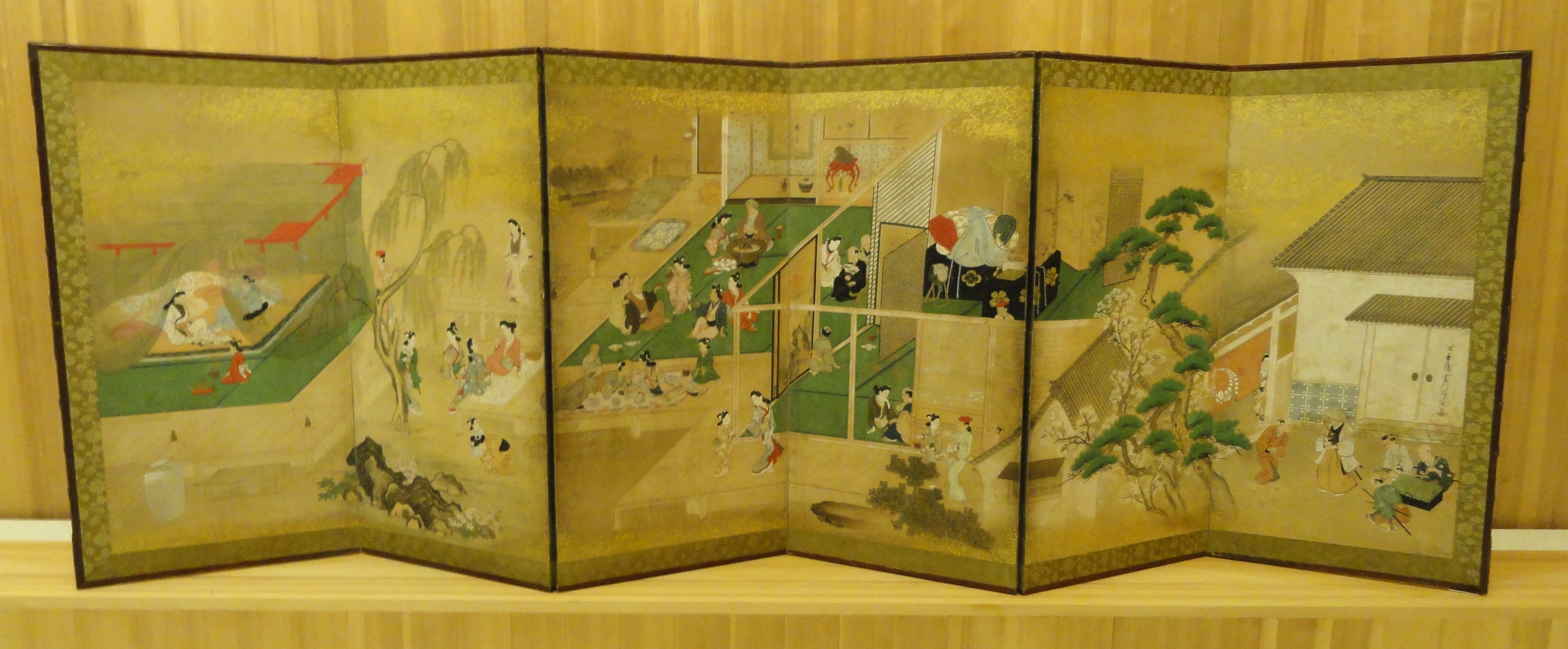
Gardens and Pavilions of Pleasure, late 17th century, Nelson-Atkins Museum of Art.

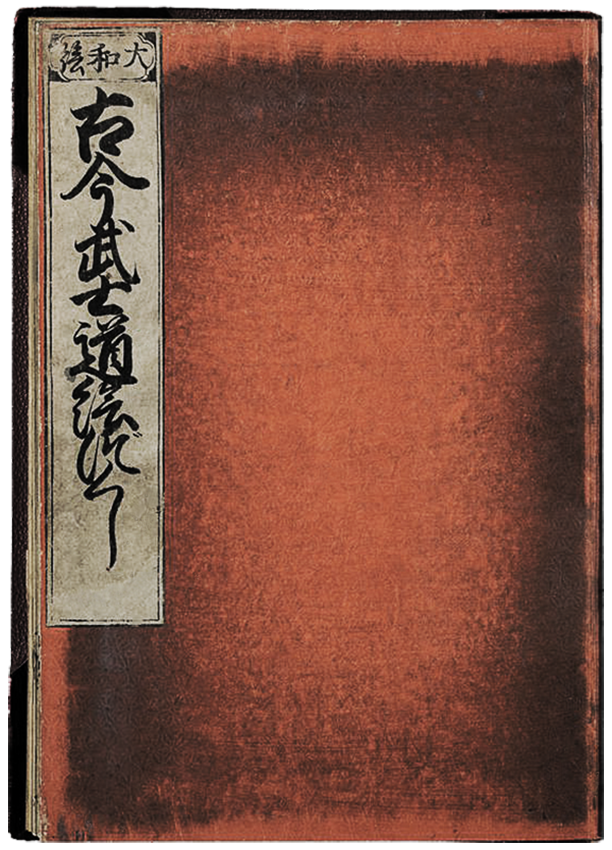
Book cover of Kokon Bushido Ezukushi (Bushido Through The Ages) (1685)

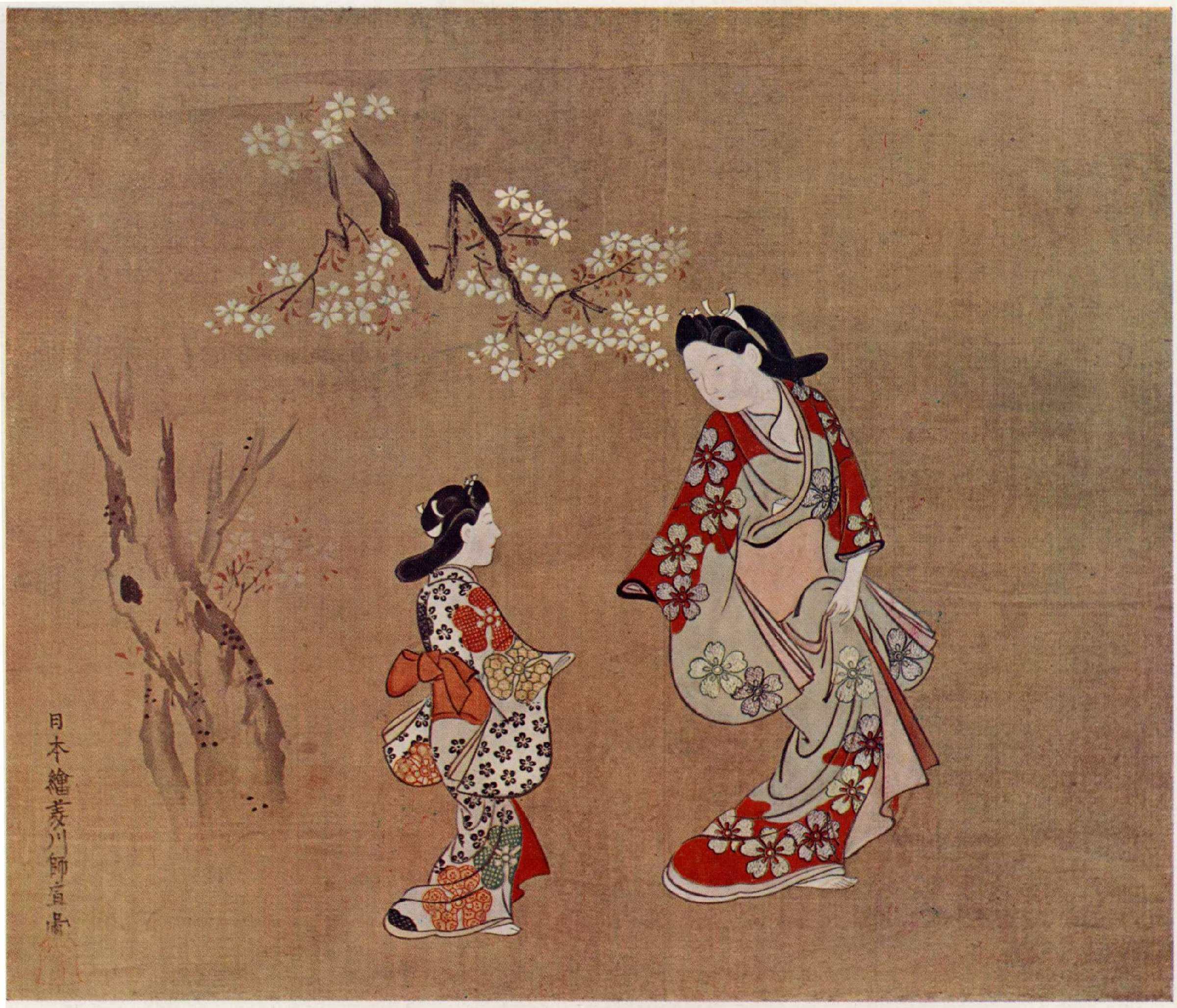
Two beauties (ink and color on silk)
