= Herbert Kisza =

Czech painter and sculptor (born 1943)

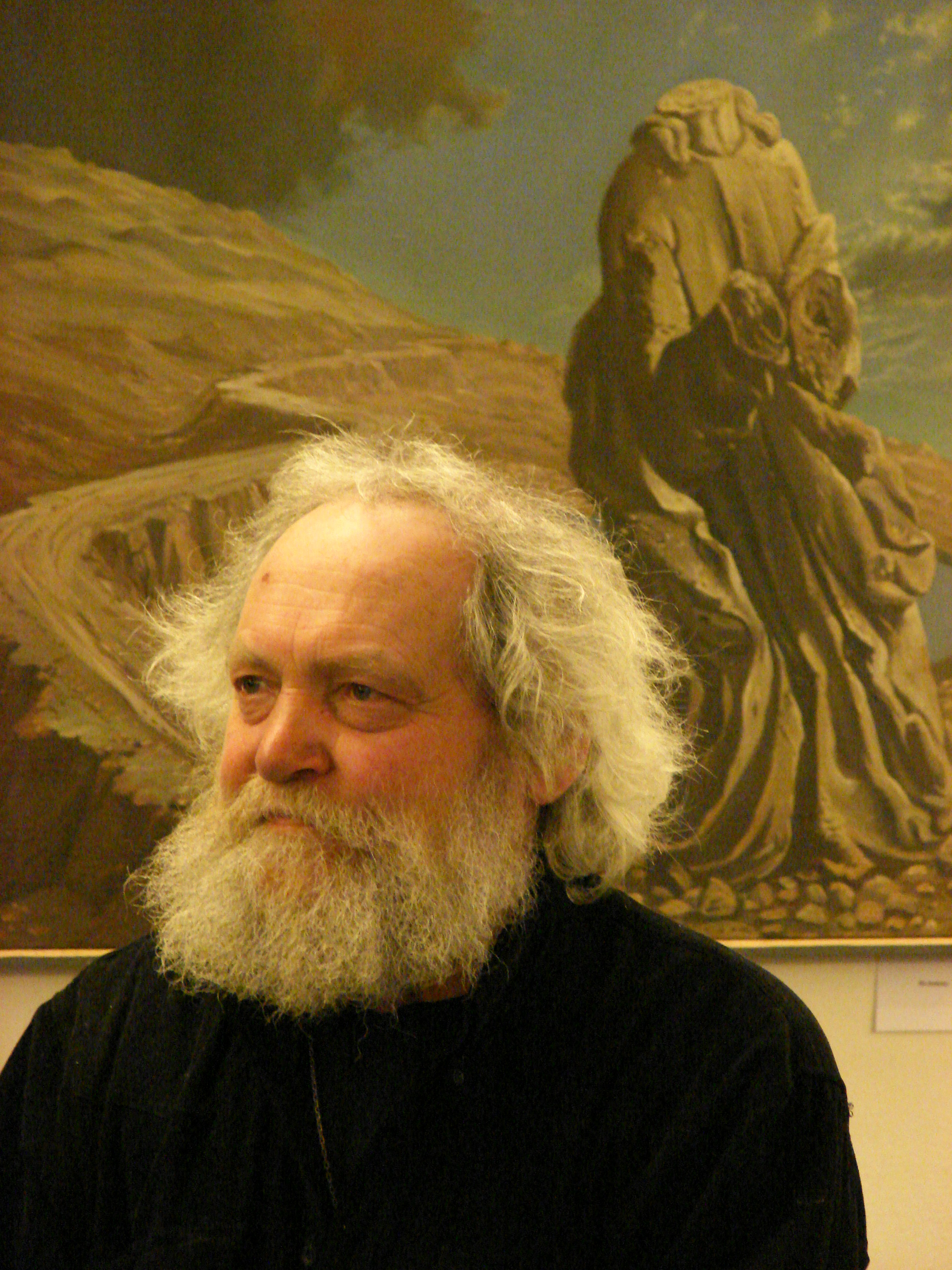
Herbert Kisza (2009)

Herbert Kisza (born 16 June 1943 in Podobora, now part of Chotěbuz) is a Czech painter and sculptor.

== Life ==
Kisza was the third child of a Silesian couple. His father was an electrician but painted as a hobby; after Kisza completed elementary school in Český Těšín, his father enrolled him in the Secondary School of Arts and Crafts in Brno where he attended from 1957 to 1961. He attended College of Applied Arts (UMPRUM) in Prague where he graduated, with a specialization in monumental painting, from the studio of Alois Fišárek in 1967.

In 1972 Kisza moved with his wife to Kadaň, where his daughter, Ester, and his two sons Kryštof, a photographer, and Šimon were born. He taught in the local Afternoon School of Art for three years. In 1991, he opened the U Netopýra Gallery, including his own work, now one of the largest private galleries in Central Europe with a permanent exhibition of the work of a single painter.

He organised several sculpting workshops in Franciscan Monastery in Kadaň and took part in many others elsewhere.

== Work ==
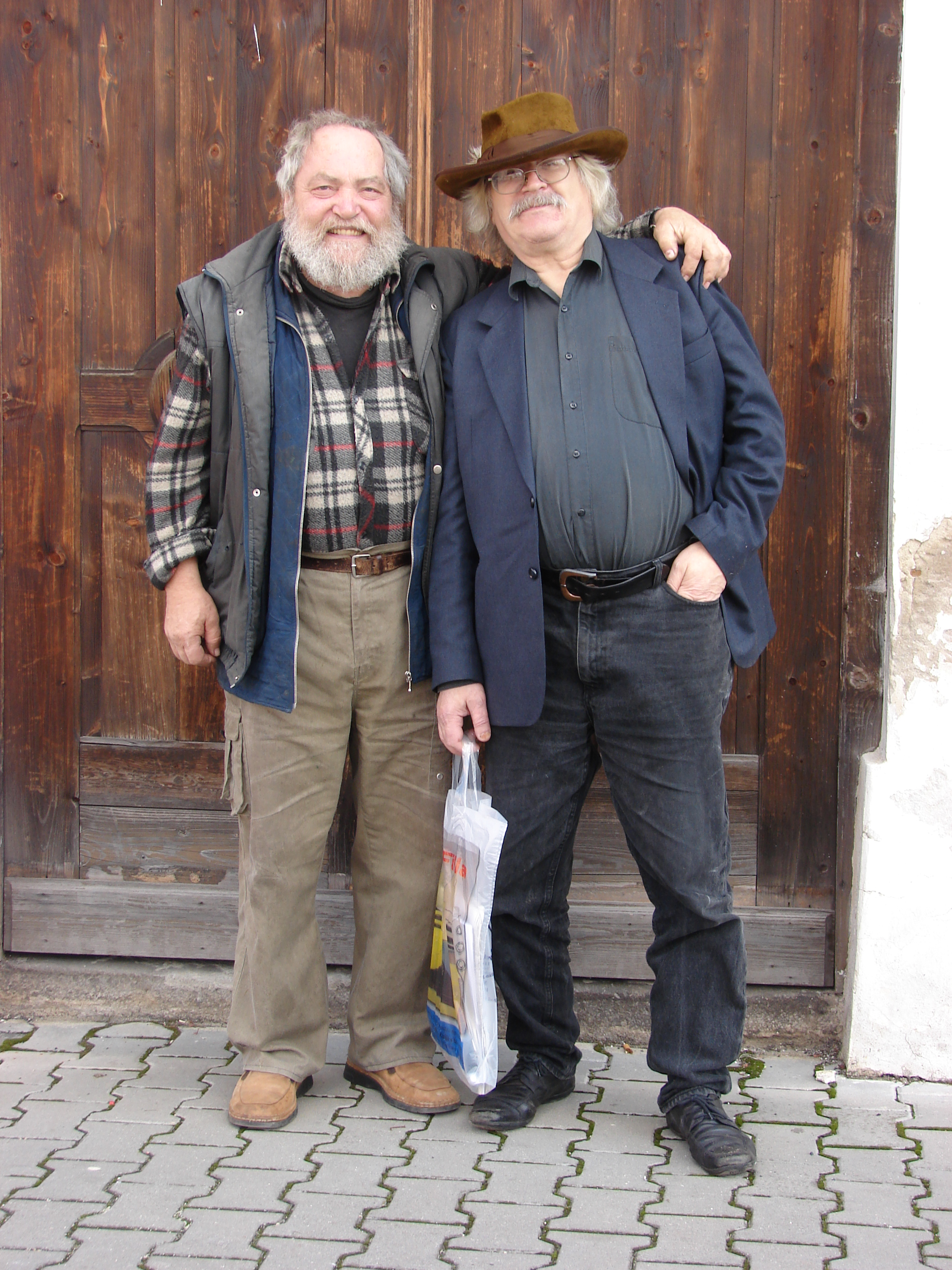
Herbert Kisza and Ivan Martin Jirous (2008)

For Herbert Kisza, objective reality is a medium to turn the painting to a dream or a poem full of metaphors and symbols. He uses the legacy of ancient myths for depicting the life of modern society. After moving to Kadaň, its industrial surroundings drew him to ecological topics. The play of light is important in his paintings.

Herbert Kisza has turned to graphic art and sculpture. He also draws ex libris. In 2000 he published a book of photographs about Kadaň with over 1,000 photographs. Kisza's pictures are in National Gallery in Prague and the galleries in Louny, Litoměřice, Most, Liberec and others.
