= Ryuji Kohno =

Ryuji Kohno (born 1956) is an engineer from the Yokohama National University, Yokohama City, Kanagawa, Japan. He was named Fellow of the Institute of Electrical and Electronics Engineers (IEEE) in 2012 for his contributions to spread spectrum and ultra wideband technologies and applications.
