= Ryūsei Kishida =

Japanese painter (1891–1929)

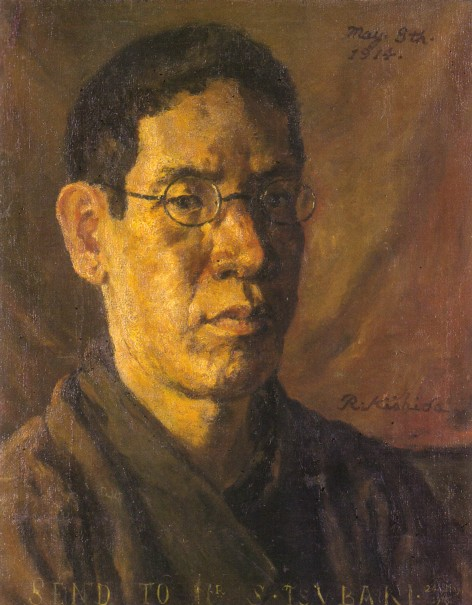
- Ryūsei Kishida
- Born: June 23, 1891; Tokyo, Japan
- Died: December 20, 1929 (aged 38); Tokuyama, Yamaguchi
- Known for: Painter
- Movement: Yōga

Ryūsei Kishida (岸田 劉生, Kishida Ryūsei; June 23, 1891 – December 20, 1929) was a Japanese painter in Taishō and Shōwa period Japan. He is best known for his realistic yōga-style portraiture, but also for his nihonga paintings in the 1920s.

== Biography ==
Kishida was born in the Ginza district of Tokyo in 1891, the son of Kishida Ginkō, a noted journalist who once assisted James Curtis Hepburn compile his Japanese-English dictionary. Kishida left school in 1908 to study Western-style art under Kuroda Seiki at his Hakubakai studio. He began exhibiting his works at the government’s annual Bunten exhibition in 1910.

While his earliest works reflect the plein-air style promoted by Kuroda, Kishida later became close friends with Mushanokōji Saneatsu and his Shirakaba (White Birch Society), through which he was introduced to Fauvism and Cubism. He formed his own artistic circle called Fyūzankai (Fusain Society) in 1912 to help promote the styles of humanism and Post-Impressionism. The group soon collapsed due to internal conflicts after holding two exhibitions, but Kishida created another circle called Sōdosha in 1915. Among his associates in this group was the artist Kohno Michisei.

From around 1917, Kishida relocated his residence to the seaside Kugenuma neighborhood of Fujisawa, Kanagawa, near the summer home of his friend Mushanokōji. He also began to incorporate the techniques of northern European Renaissance artists such as Albrecht Dürer and Van Eyck into realistic portraiture, but did not directly copy their styles. During this period, he painted his famous series of paintings of his daughter Reiko, which combine photographic realism with almost surreal decorative elements, which exhibit the tension between expressionism and technique. His famous Kiritōshi no shasei, also painted near this time realistically depicts a path through a hill. However, it is not an actual path that Kishida viewed and painted, but is a “universal scene” which could be set anywhere in the world, at any point in time.

In the early 1920s, Kishida suddenly expressed a new interest for nihonga, incorporating elements from eastern art, in particular Chinese paintings of the Song and Yuan dynasties, as well as early ukiyo-e paintings. In 1922, he was an early member of the Shunyo-kai art society. His home in Kugenuma was destroyed by the Great Kantō earthquake of 1923, and he moved to Kyoto for a brief period before moving to Kamakura in February 1926. In the 1920s, he came to be noted as an art historian as well as a painter, writing numerous articles on Aesthetics and Japanese painting.

In 1929, sponsored by the South Manchuria Railway Company, Kishida made his one and only overseas trip, visiting Dalian, Fengtian and Harbin in Manchuria. On his way back to Kamakura, he made a stop at Tokuyama, Yamaguchi, where he died of uremia at the age of 38. His grave is at the Tama Cemetery in Fuchū, Tokyo.

After his death, two of his paintings were designated National Important Cultural Properties by the Japanese government's Agency for Cultural Affairs.

In December 2000, one of his portraits Reiko a shawl on her shoulders was sold for 360 million Yen, the highest price ever achieved in auction for a Japanese painting.

Portrait of Reiko Sitting
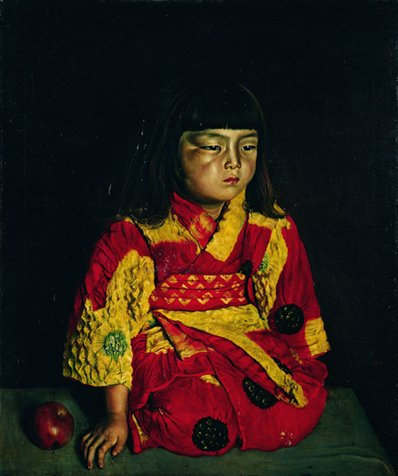
- Artist: Ryūsei Kishida
- Year: 1919
- Medium: Oil on wood
- Dimensions: 72.7 cm × 60.7 cm (28.6 in × 23.9 in)
- Location: Pola Museum of Art, Hakone, Kanagawa

== Noted works ==
- A Road Cut Through a Hill (道路と土手と塀(切通之写生)), 1915, Tokyo National Museum of Modern Art, National Important Cultural Property
- Portrait of Reiko, age 5 (麗子肖像(麗子五歳之像)), 1918, Tokyo National Museum of Modern Art
- Reiko laughing (麗子微笑), 1921, Tokyo National Museum, National Important Cultural Property

== Gallery ==
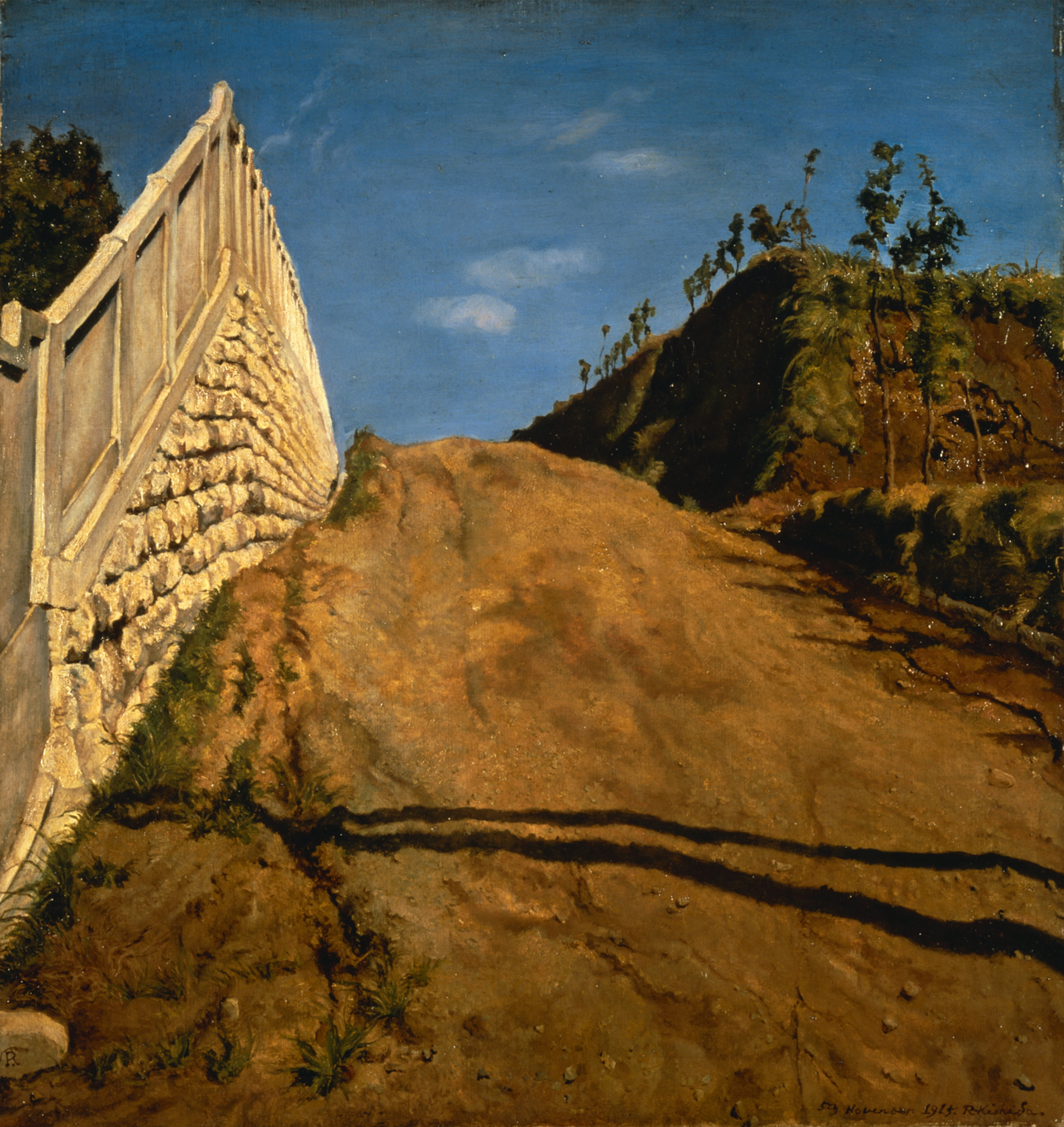
A Road Cut Through a Hill (1915)

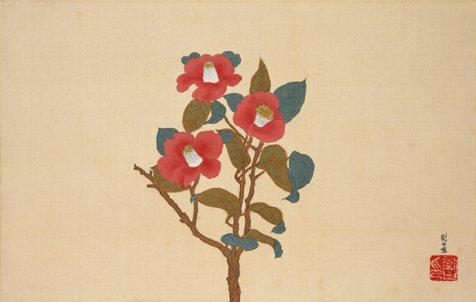
Camellias (c. 1924)

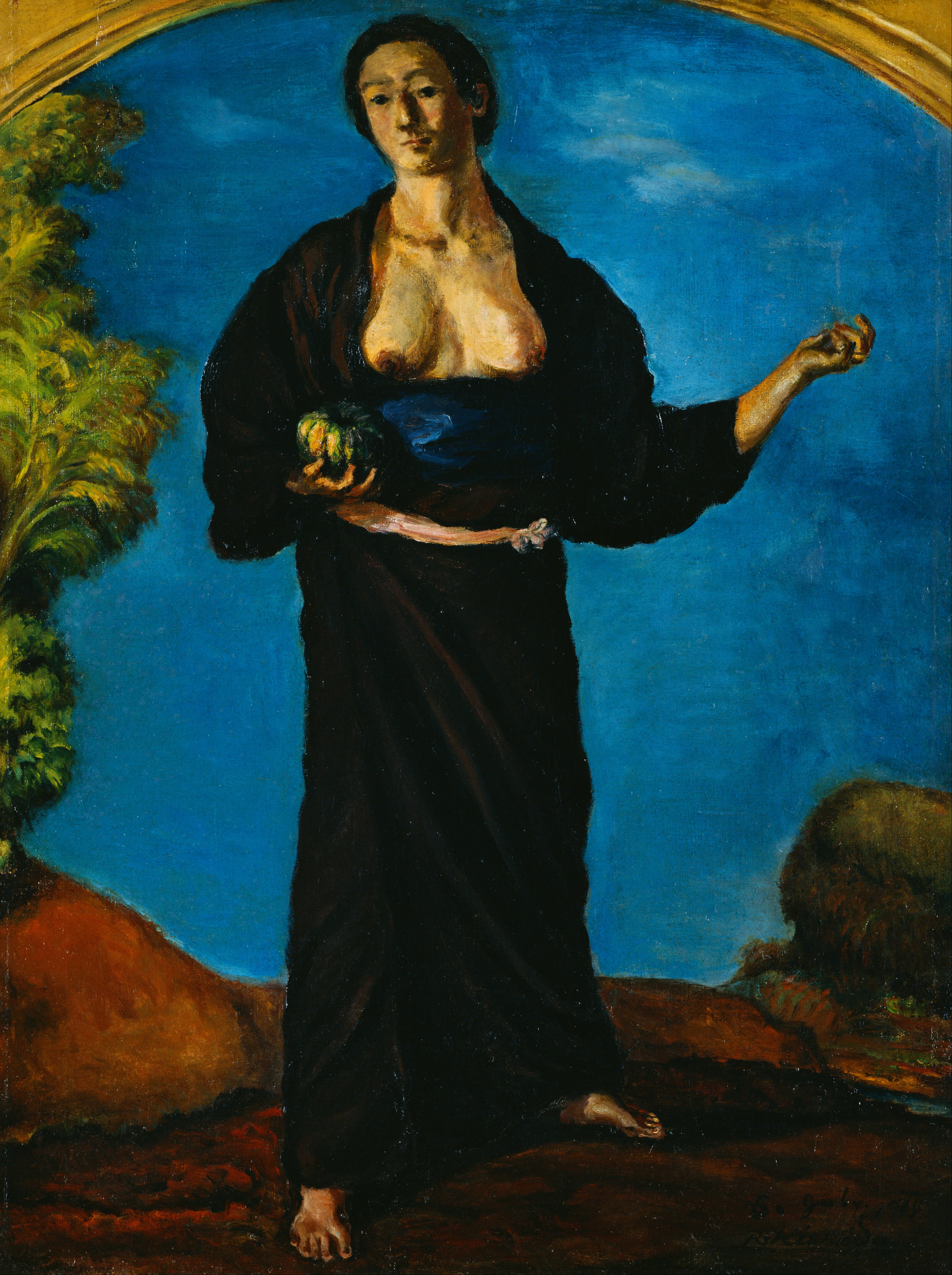
Woman with a Pumpkin (1914)

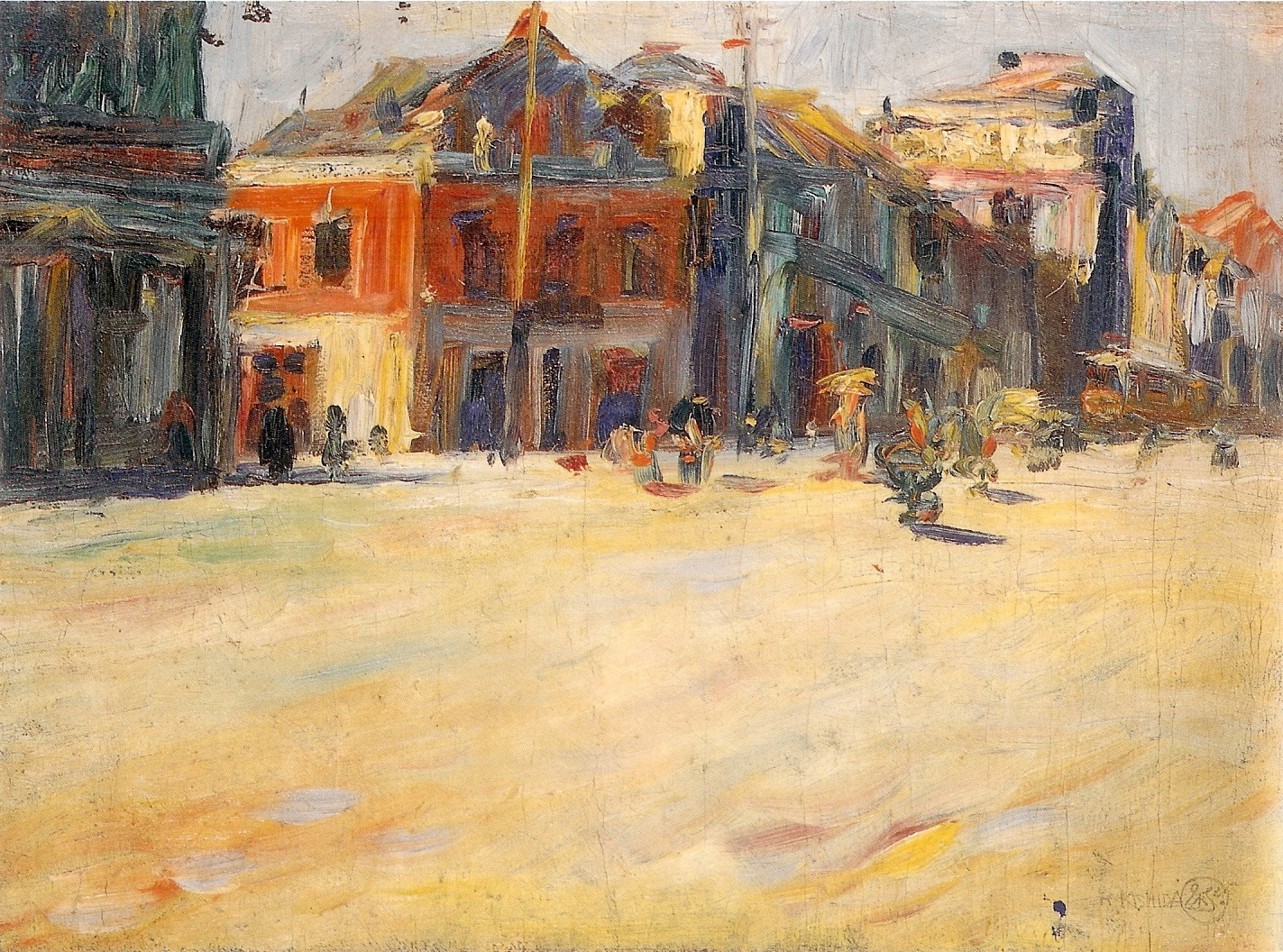
The Ginza (1911)

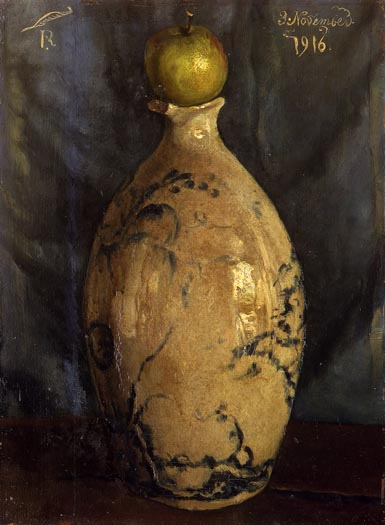
An Apple on Top of a Pot (1916)
