= Igor Kufayev =

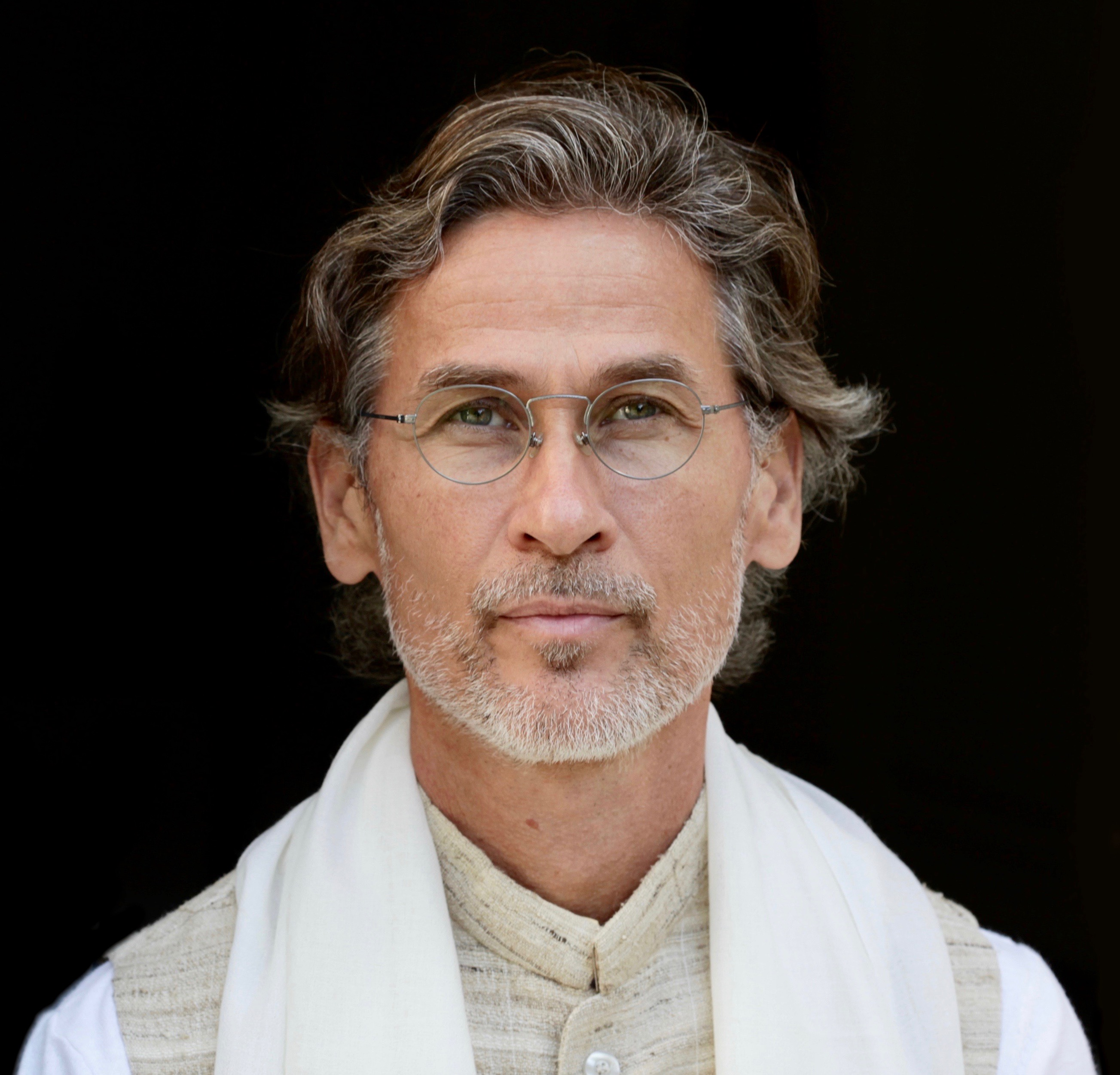
- Igor Kufayev (2017)
- Born: January 5, 1966 (age 60); Tashkent, Uzbekistan
- Occupations: artist, spiritual teacher
- Website: www.igorkufayev.org

Igor Anvar Kufayev /ˈkuːfəjɛv/ (Russian: И́горь Анва́р Kу́фаев, IPA: [ˈiɡərʲ ɐnˈvar ˈkufəɪf]; born January 5, 1966), is a spiritual leader, author and British artist of the 1990s generation.

== Early years ==
Igor Kufayev was born in Tashkent, Uzbekistan. Classically trained in art from an early age he attended a private studio of a martial artist and painter Shamil Rakhimov, a place of underground meetings between liberal thinkers, poets and painters. Kufayev was educated at the Art College in Tashkent, and then at the Theater and Art Institute's department of Mural painting. The violent death of his mentor lead to young Igor's decision to become an artist. Kufayev received his formal education at the Art College in Tashkent, and after two years of compulsory military service, resumed his studies at the Theater and Art Institute, at the department of Mural painting. In 1988 he was accepted as a student of a second year to the Academy of Arts (now Imperial Academy of Arts) in St Petersburg, Russia. Independently of his official program, he studied and painted directly from the masterpieces of western art, in the Hermitage Museum.

== Artistic career ==
Igor Kufayev, Kneeling figure, 1993, oil on canvas, 127x127 cm, London, Collection of Sir Elton John

In 1990 Kufayev moved to Warsaw, Poland. An encounter with the art critic Andrzej Matynia led to Kufayev's first solo exhibition, Eternal Compromise at the Monetti Gallery, Warsaw. He was invited to take part in The Meeting of Sacred Images, at the National Museum of Ethnography in Warsaw, with his triptych Compromise alongside works by artists of earlier times.

He moved to London in August 1991, the same year his six-year-old daughter from his first marriage died in a road accident. He remained in a prolonged period of grief unable to paint, but came out of the slump in 1994, with a one-man exhibition entitled Burnt Earth, dedicated to the memory of his daughter; Robin Dutt gave it a favourable review in The Independent. He opened his own studio in London where he held private views of his work annually. From 1995 to 1997 he worked on a series of four tondos under the title Zauber. In January 1996 he was granted British Citizenship.

In 2001, the art critic Brian Sewell described Kufayev as a "driven painter, scrupulous draughtsman, intellect and imagination wrestling with seemingly equal force".

Igor Kufayev, Purusha, 1995, tondo, oil on canvas, diameter 80 cm, London, Private Collection

== Spiritual transformation ==
An early interest towards spirituality led to his practice of Yoga with initiation in 1996 to Transcendental Meditation. He immersed himself in the study of diverse spiritual traditions with special emphasis on Indian philosophy, Sufi, and Zen. In 2001, at the age of thirty-six, in the wake of the TM-Sidhi Program (an advanced yogic course), Igor describes as having undergone a radical transformation of consciousness. He abandoned his art career and for the next five years he continued long hours of meditation, integrating expanded state of awareness throughout his daily activities. During that time he discovered the teachings of Swami Muktananda which led him to the tradition of Kashmir Shaivism. Its 'transcendental physicalism' appealed to his down to earth, creative sensibility, unique to that tradition's doctrine of Spanda (Sanskrit: "throb, vibration") which had been verified by direct experience, in perceiving the World as a Throb of Pure Consciousness in the Heart of his own.

In October 2006, in an interview with Seva Novgorodsev for the BBC Russian Service, Kufayev talked about his years as an artist and the decision to leave painting.

== Philosophy and teaching ==
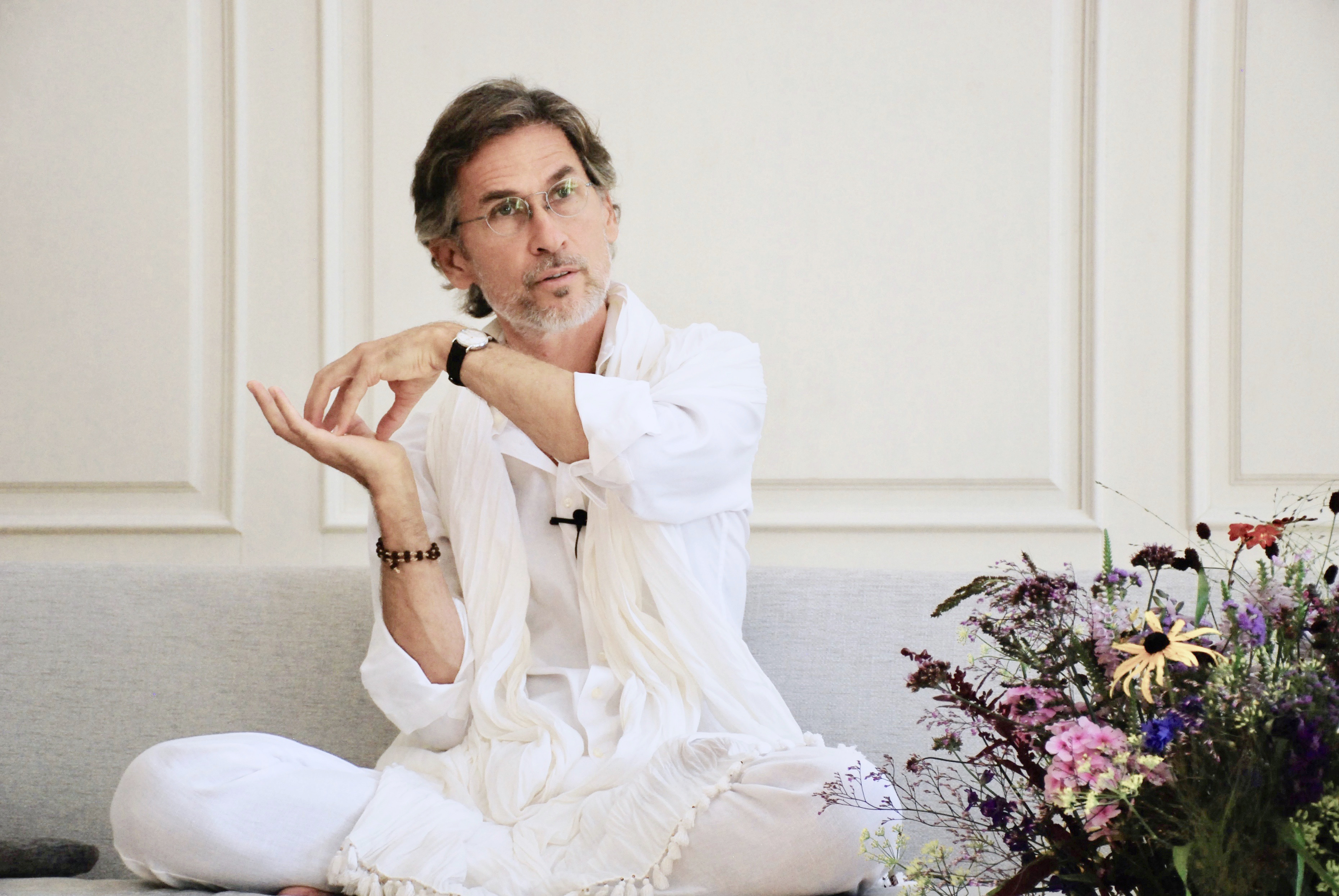
Igor Kufayev leading a retreat at Gut Saunstorf, Germany, August 2017

Since 2002 Kufayev began teaching which comprises his insights into the nature of Being. Despite many requests, he declined to place himself in the role of a teacher until he made the conscious decision to give his full time to teaching in February 2008. Since 2012 he has offered online webinars and in-person gatherings and retreats worldwide.

Although his initial spiritual training occurred in the Transcendental Meditation program, Igor now teaches mainly using the methodologies of Tantric Kashmir Shaivism, stating that the doctrines of Kashmir Shaivism most closely match his direct experience of spiritual transformation and the nature of reality. However, Igor has studied widely, and draws from many other traditions such as Sufi and Zen. He remains elusive to categorization, maintaining that:

Abiding in a state of spontaneous absorption transcends the boundaries of any given truth based on an intellectual grasp of ultimate reality...

Igor often refers to his teaching as "The Path of the Heart," and explains that it is a non-intellectual and direct cognition of the essence of one's reality — one which transcends any tradition, because by definition it cannot be contained by a set of doctrines. Here, knowledge is not mental or intellectual, nor spoken of in terms of acquisition; it is simple direct knowingness itself — beyond concepts and precepts, understanding, and language. Igor explains this:

So when I said I don't belong to any tradition, I want to make one little adjustment to that. I do belong to a tradition and that is the tradition which could be called simply, "the heart." And don't try to decipher it again through any "isms" or spiritual traditions, because the experience of the heart transcends all traditions. And the time has come when we have to transcend those traditions that calcify to themselves...

Central to Igor's teaching methodology is the transmission of spiritual energy, which occurs primarily during in-person events. He has commented that "the real work happens at the immersions — the real work happens in these specifically created containers." Participants at his immersions commonly experience spontaneous, involuntary kriyas, in the form of asanas, pranayama, glossolalia, and vocal harmonizing.

Igor emphasizes the psycho-physiological aspects of the awakening process, stressing the importance of the physical transformation of the nervous system. He states that the physiology acts as a support for individual consciousness to mature into what is often termed as "enlightenment." He also stresses the necessity of sitting meditation in spiritual practice, stating that while other methodologies may give peak experiences, it is only in sitting meditation that integration takes place, which is required for a permanent shift in consciousness.

In 2015, Igor consecrated the Flowing Wakefulness Sangha, with a stated mission to serve "as a platform for revealing and realizing possibilities for a Consciousness-based culture, aimed at the recognition, development and actualization of the fullest potential present in human birth."

In September 2013 Igor Kufayev was interviewed for the 'Conscious TV' (London based Channel), where he shared his views on the subtleties of awakening process based on biographical events of his life, and addressed the unifying complexity of self-realization and integration of higher states of awareness as seen from the biological perspective of human consciousness.

The publication of Camatkāra: The Hidden Path in Spring 2023 launched Igor Kufayev as an author. This book is a collection of discourses delivered over a number of years at live events, transcribed and rendered into written form while keeping with the immediacy of its oral delivery. Therein, he presents the experience of Beauty as a unique path toward direct communion with the Divine and aesthetic rapture as a universal spiritual practice.

His second book, KUṆḌALINĪ The Goddess as the Power of Self-Recognition in Tantric Śaivism, was published in January 2026. Drawing on the Trika tradition of Kashmir Śaivism, Kufayev presents Kuṇḍalinī as the self-manifesting power (śakti) of consciousness rather than as a subtle bodily "energy" or a psychological metaphor. The book contrasts this framework with common modern interpretations and offers a sustained exposition of Kuṇḍalinī within a non-dual Śaiva context.

== Private life ==
Igor now lives with his partner and their three small children in Mallorca, Balearic Islands, Spain. In 2006 he moved back to Uzbekistan and lived in his birth city of Tashkent for almost four years. Between April 2011 and December 2012 he and his family were traveling in Central America with the base in Costa Rica, followed by spending nine months, until September 2013, in Mallorca.

Kufayev has a grown-up daughter from a previous relationship who lives in Warsaw, Poland.

== Publications ==
=== Books ===
- KUṆḌALINĪ The Goddess as the Power of Self-Recognition in Tantric Śaivism, Softcover edition, January 2026, ISBN 978-94-647527-2-4
- Camatkāra: the Hidden Path, Paperback Exclusive edition, June 2023, SONG Publishing, ISBN 978-94-647527-1-7
- Camatkāra: the Hidden Path, Hardcover cloth, Limited Edition, January 2023, SONG Publishing, ISBN 978-94-647527-0-0

=== Selected essays ===
- The Hidden Axis: Kuṇḍalinī, Touch and Ritual, Published by Tarka Journal, Volume 9, On Power, July 2026
- Die Triade der kosmischen Manifestation, Published by Yoga Aktuell Magazine, Issue 159, April 2026
- Der verborgene Pfad (The Hidden Path), Published by Yoga Aktuell Magazine, October/November, 2023
- Czasami Musimy Dać Się Życiu Ponieść, Published by Newsweek Psychologia, September 20, 2023
- The Path of Beauty & Delight, Published by Watkins Magazine, Issue 74, July 13, 2023
- Kundalini Die Definition Des Undefinierbaren, Published by Yoga Aktuell Magazine, May 31, 2022
- Kundalini: Defining the Undefinable, Published by Watkins Magazine, May 24, 2021
- The World is As You See It, Published by Sufi Journal, Issue 98, Winter 2020
- The Nature of Pain, Published by Science to Sage Magazine, Issue 31, November 3, 2020
- Schönheit ist alles, was ist (Beauty Is All There Is), Published by Evolve Magazine, Issue 27, August–October 2020
- Spontaner Yoga – von Gnade berührt (Spontaneous Yoga – Touched by Grace), Published by Yoga Aktuell Magazine, Issue 102, January/February 2017
- Aesthetic Rapture, Published by InZicht Magazine, Volume 7, May 2015 #2
- Shanta Rasa – der Geschmack des Friedens, Published by Yoga Aktuell Magazine, Issue 105, August/September 2014
- Vibrant Self, Published by InZicht Magazine, Volume 16, May 2014 #2
- The World is As You See It, Published by InZicht Magazine, Volume 15, February 2013 #1
- Vibrant Self, Published by Namarupa: Categories of Indian Thought, Issue 18, Winter 2013–14
- The World is As You See It, Published by Namarupa: Categories of Indian Thought, Issue 17, Summer 2013
