= Roar Kjernstad =

Norwegian painter

- Roar Kjærnstad
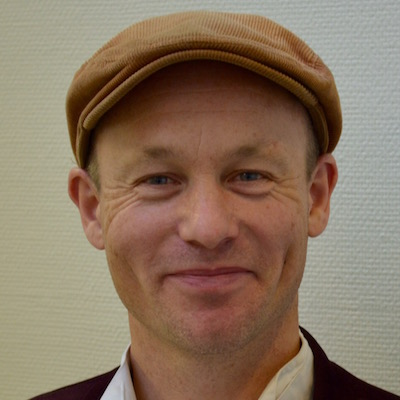
- Born: 1975 (age 50–51); Espa, Norway
- Citizenship: Norwegian
- Occupation: Painter
- Website: kjernstad.com

Roar kjernstad, Let's have a feast in the light of spring! (2007), private collection

Roar Kjernstad (born 1975, Espa, Norway) is a painter who specialises in traditional figurative work.

== Education and career ==
Kjernstad trained at the Nansen Academy in Lillehammer and at the Royal Academy of Fine Arts, Antwerp, focusing at the latter on study of the Old Masters.

In his view, painters and artists in general should be craftsmen. But unlike Nerdrum and according to the retrogardists, Kjernstad still believes that traditional and figurative artists should claim the term "art" rather than use the name "kitsch" for their work. The use of the term "kitsch" shows no respect to the skills traditional and figurative artist need to have and to the eternal values of beauty they believe in.

== Selected exhibitions ==
- 2023: Galleri Hervold Hamar
- 2023: Ørland Sparebanks kunstnerstipend
- 2022: Hamsungalleriet Tranøy
- 2021: Galleri Vanntårnet with Olav Starheim
- 2020: Galleri Briskeby
- 2019: Nils Aas senteret
- 2018: Vertical Gallery, Chicago
- 2017: Museum Nord
- 2014: Sutton Gallery, Scotland
- 2012: Galleri A, Oslo
