= Boguszowice, Cieszyn =

Coordinates: 49°46′14.2″N 18°36′56″E

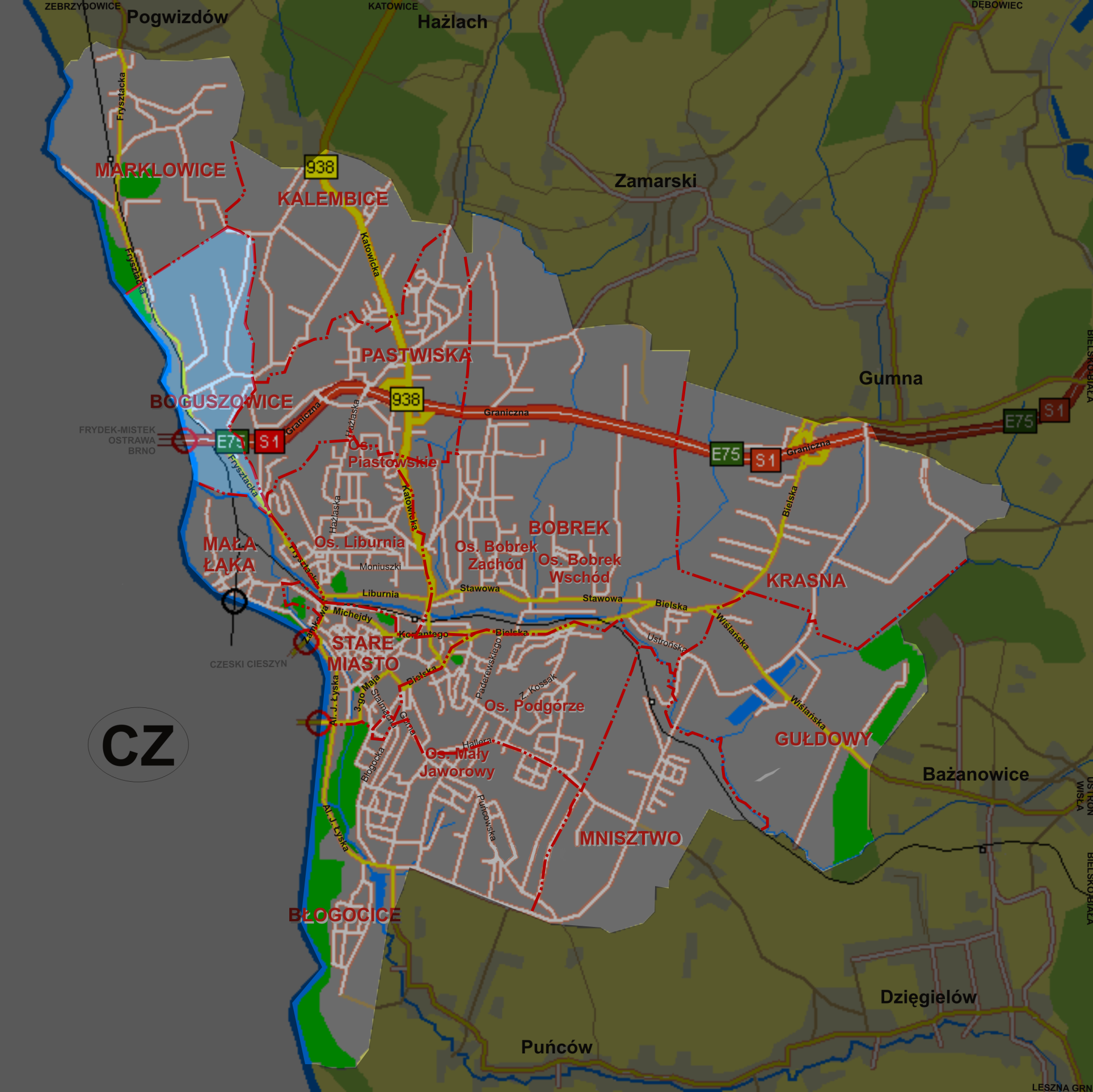
Boguszowice highlighted on map of Cieszyn

Boguszowice is a district of Cieszyn, Silesian Voivodeship, Poland. It was a separate municipality, but became administratively a part of Cieszyn in 1973.

On 31 January 1290 the duke Mieszko gave his knight Bogusz 10 Franconian łans of land to form a new village. This document was the very first when Mieszko used the title of Duke of Cieszyn, thus when the new Duchy of Teschen began to exist. The new village of Bogusovici was however not mentioned in Liber fundationis episcopatus Vratislaviensis around 1305, but as a fully developed village it was mentioned in 1388, when it was sold by two knights Jaśko and Janusz from Ogrodzona to Bielik from Kornice and his mother, Juta. As so it is clear that it was a patrimonial knights' village, and the price of it was similar to other fully developed villages of that time. Since 1425 the village was given by Cieszyn citizen Jan Scholz to the hospital located in Frysztackie suburb of Cieszyn.

Under the international bridge between Poland and the Czech Republic a bunker from the 1930s is located.
