= Kohno Michisei =

Japanese painter (1895–1950)

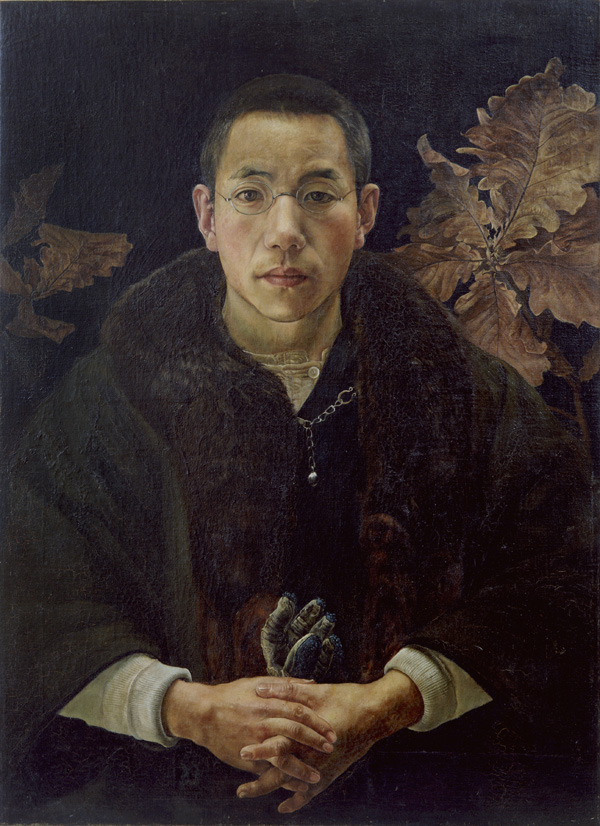
- Self-Portrait, 1917, oil on canvas, in the Arthur M. Sackler Gallery
- Born: 1895; Isesaki, Gunma, Japan
- Died: 1950 (aged 54–55); Koganei, Tokyo
- Known for: Painter
- Movement: Yōga

Kohno Michisei ( Japanese: 河野通勢, sometimes transliterated as Kono Michisei; also known as Kono Petoru Tsusei) (June 10, 1895 – March 31, 1950) was a Japanese painter, illustrator, and printmaker known for his association with the yōga movement of the early 20th century. His work is considered representative of the Taishō period in Japanese art.

== Background ==
Michisei was born in Isezaki, Gunma Prefecture, the son of Kohno Jiro, a painter, teacher of art and portrait photographer who was also a member of the Japanese Orthodox Church; some sources state that he grew up in Nagano City. The elder Kohno also had an extensive library, which provided further inspiration for his son. Michisei soon fell under the influence of painter Kishida Ryūsei, and joined the latter's Sodosha movement in 1915; he also exhibited at times with Kokugakai, Nikakai, Shun'yokai, and Bunten. After Kishida's death Kohno turned increasingly to illustration, producing artwork for a number of novels published during the Shōwa period and working for a variety of newspapers. Beginning in 1931 he was a member of Nihon Hanga Kyokai, and he exhibited his paintings sporadically between 1933 and 1937. Among the subjects he illustrated was the 1923 Great Kantō earthquake. He also produced woodblock prints during his career, and served as art director for one film directed by Kazunobu Shigemune for Toho Studios, Matsushita mura juku, in 1939. Sekine Shoji was influenced by his work.

== Career ==
Stylistically, perhaps Kohno's greatest influence was the work of Albrecht Dürer, which he knew, as did most of his Japanese artistic contemporaries, primarily from books and magazines; indeed, the pose, color scheme, costume, and background of his Self-Portrait of 1917 indicate his familiarity with the German master's Self Portrait at Twenty-Eight Years Old Wearing a Coat with Fur Collar of 1500. The work of Michelangelo, too, provided much of Kohno's inspiration, as did the Christian faith. He repeatedly touched upon Christian themes in his work, blending them with unorthodox elements; for instance, he depicted Adam and Eve crossing the river Susobana upon their expulsion from the Garden of Eden, and painted the Virgin Mary nude at the center of his painting of the Nativity. Kohno also showed some interest in self-portraiture, returning to the medium numerous times throughout his career.

== Death and legacy ==
Kohno died in Koganei, Tokyo prefecture, in 1950, and was soon forgotten; he was, however, the subject of a 2008 retrospective at the Hiratsuka Museum of Art in Tokyo, which traveled to the Ashikaga Museum of Art, the Shoto Museum of Art, and a museum in Nagano Prefecture. Two of his paintings, a self-portrait and a portrait of his son Shuntatsu, are currently in the collection of the Arthur M. Sackler Gallery in Washington, D.C.; his work may also be seen in numerous museums in Japan, including the Hiratsuka Museum of Art, the Aichi Prefectural Museum of Art and the National Museum of Modern Art, Tokyo. A drawing is owned by the Museum of Modern Art, Kamakura & Hayama.
