= Balatonföldvár =

- Town
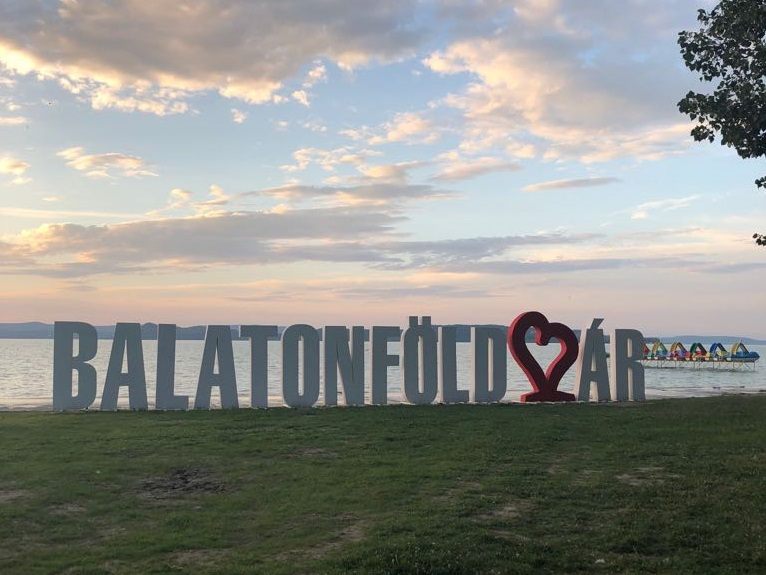
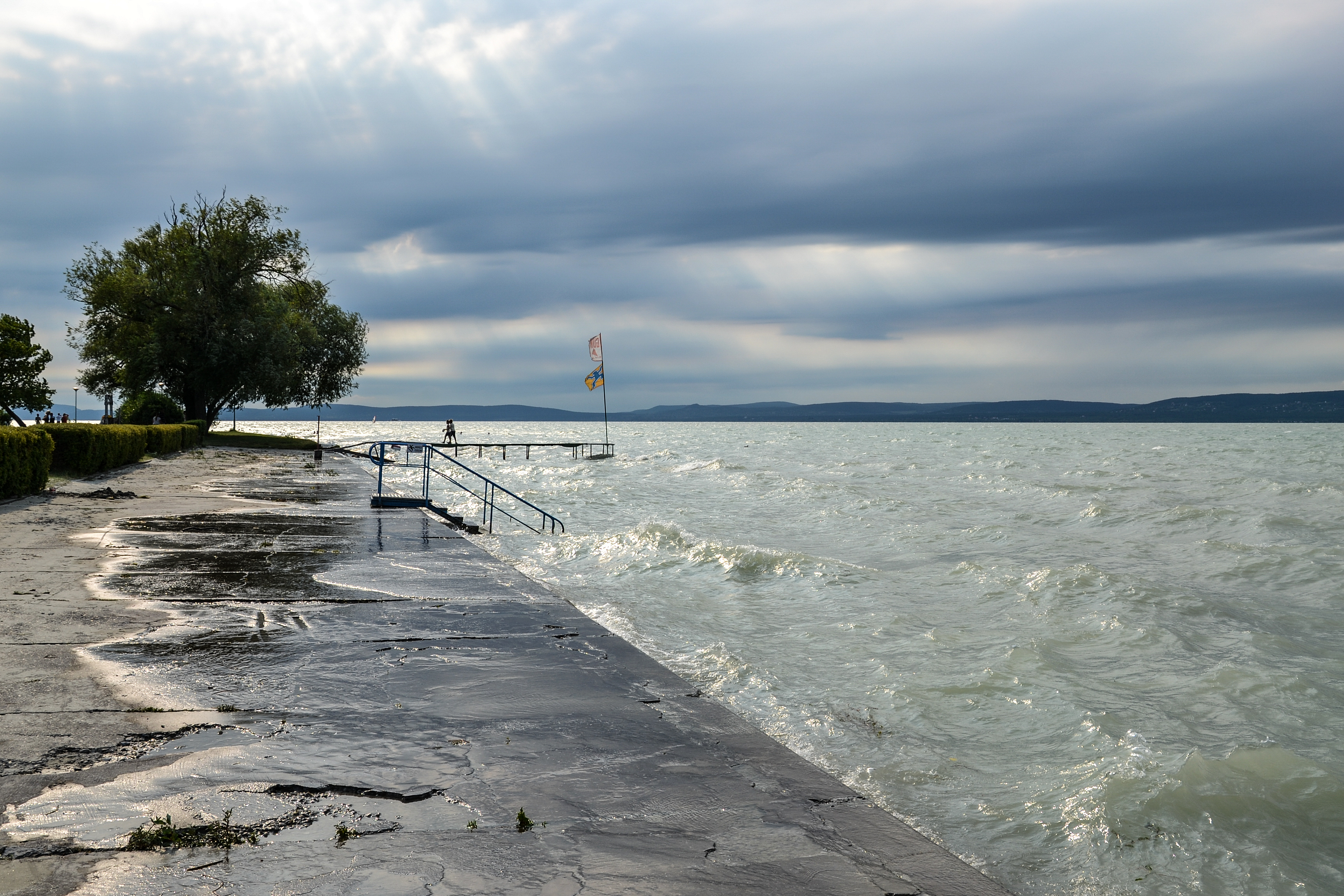
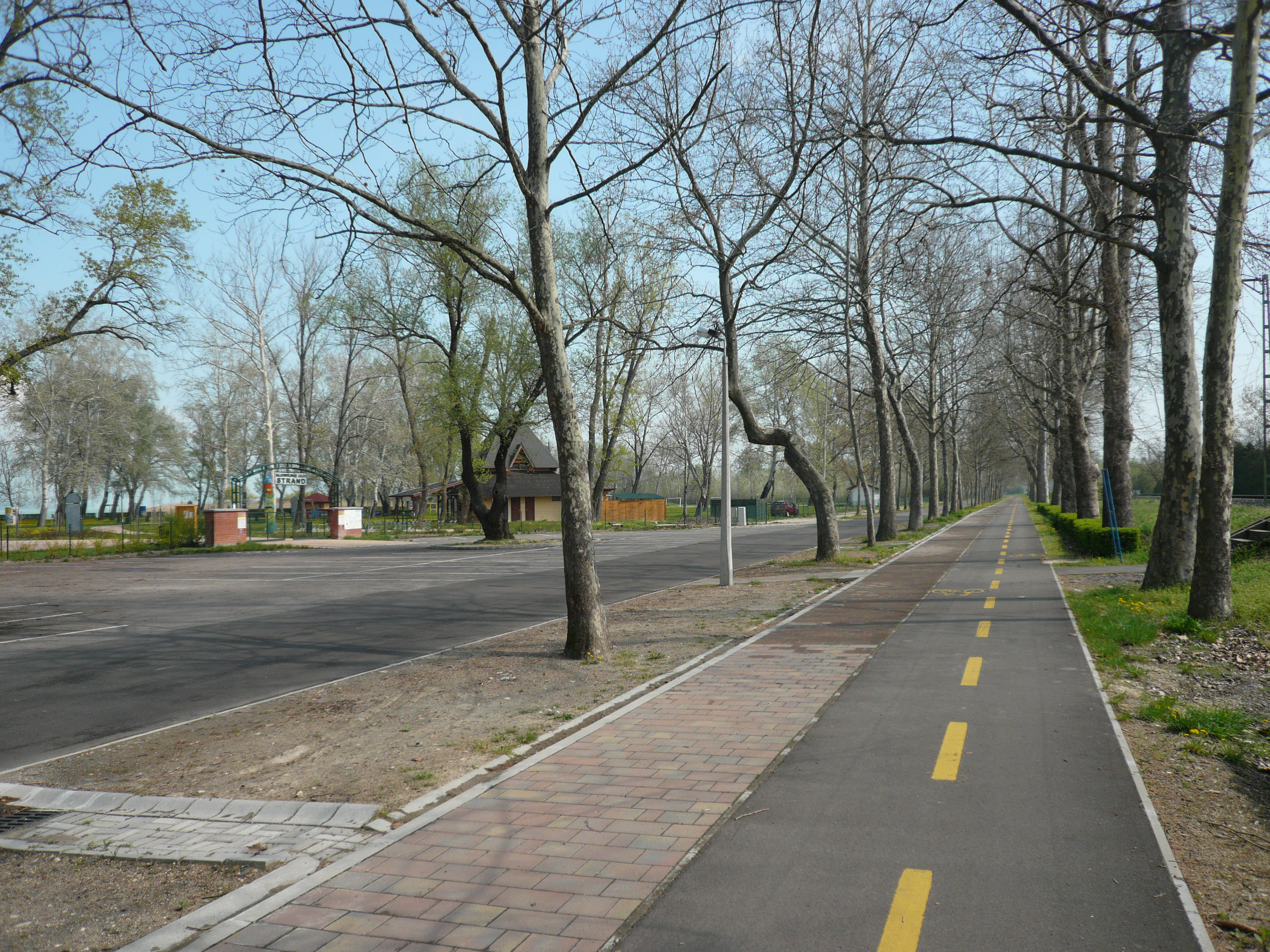
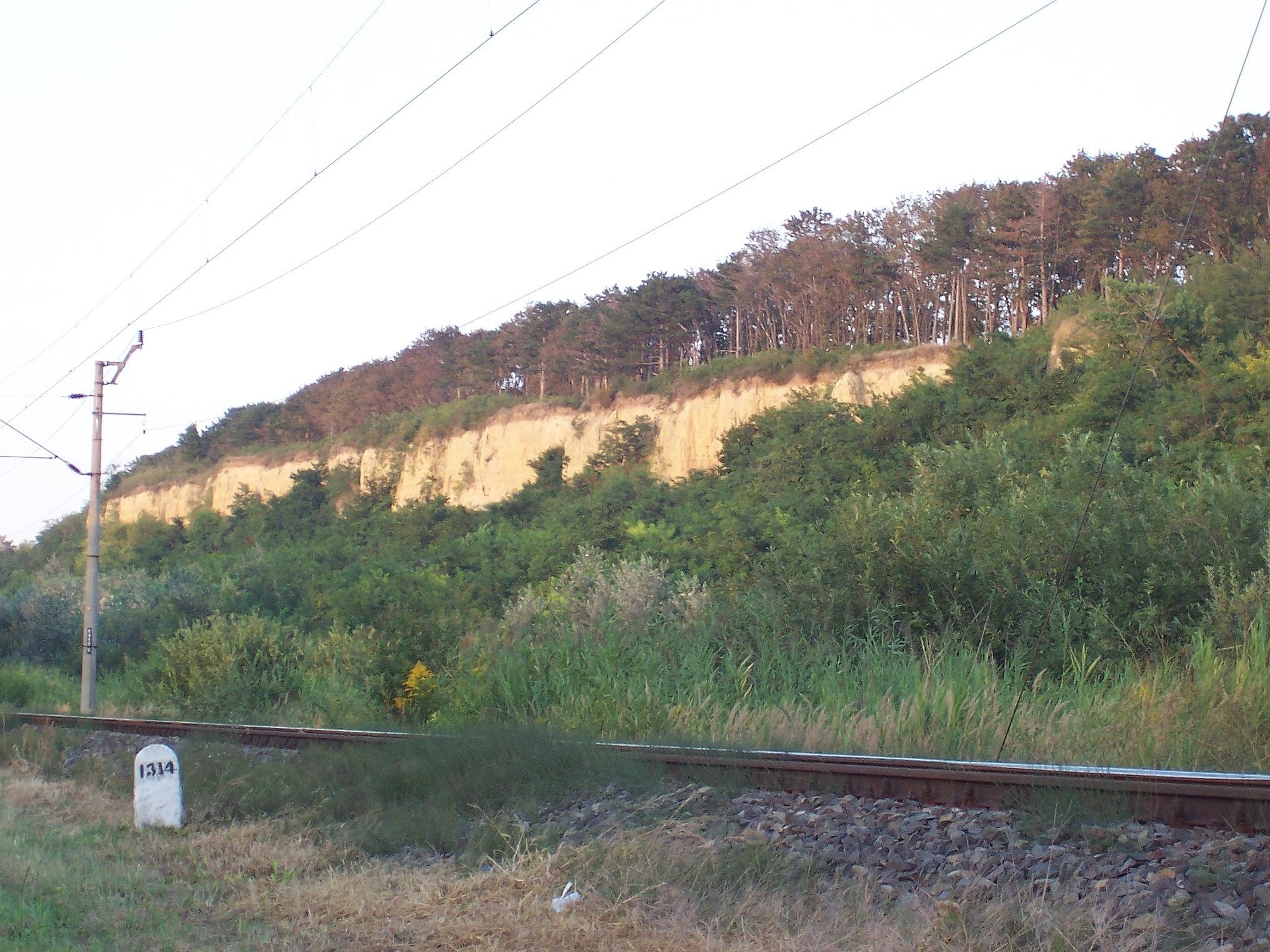
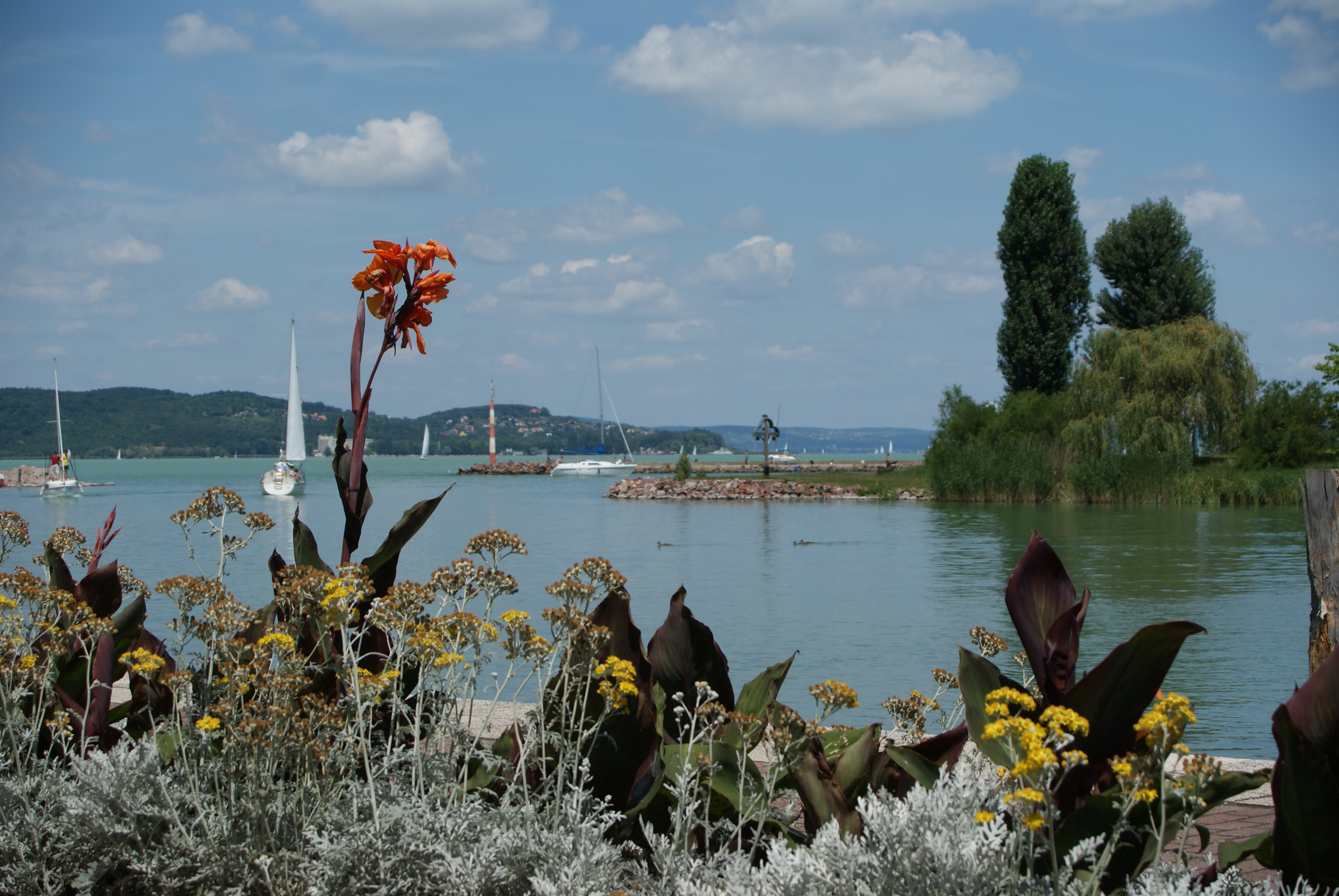
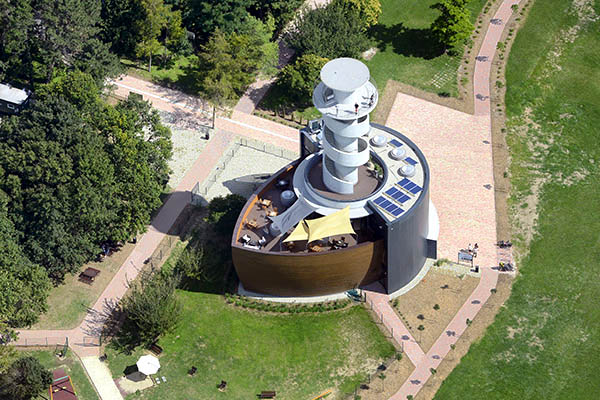
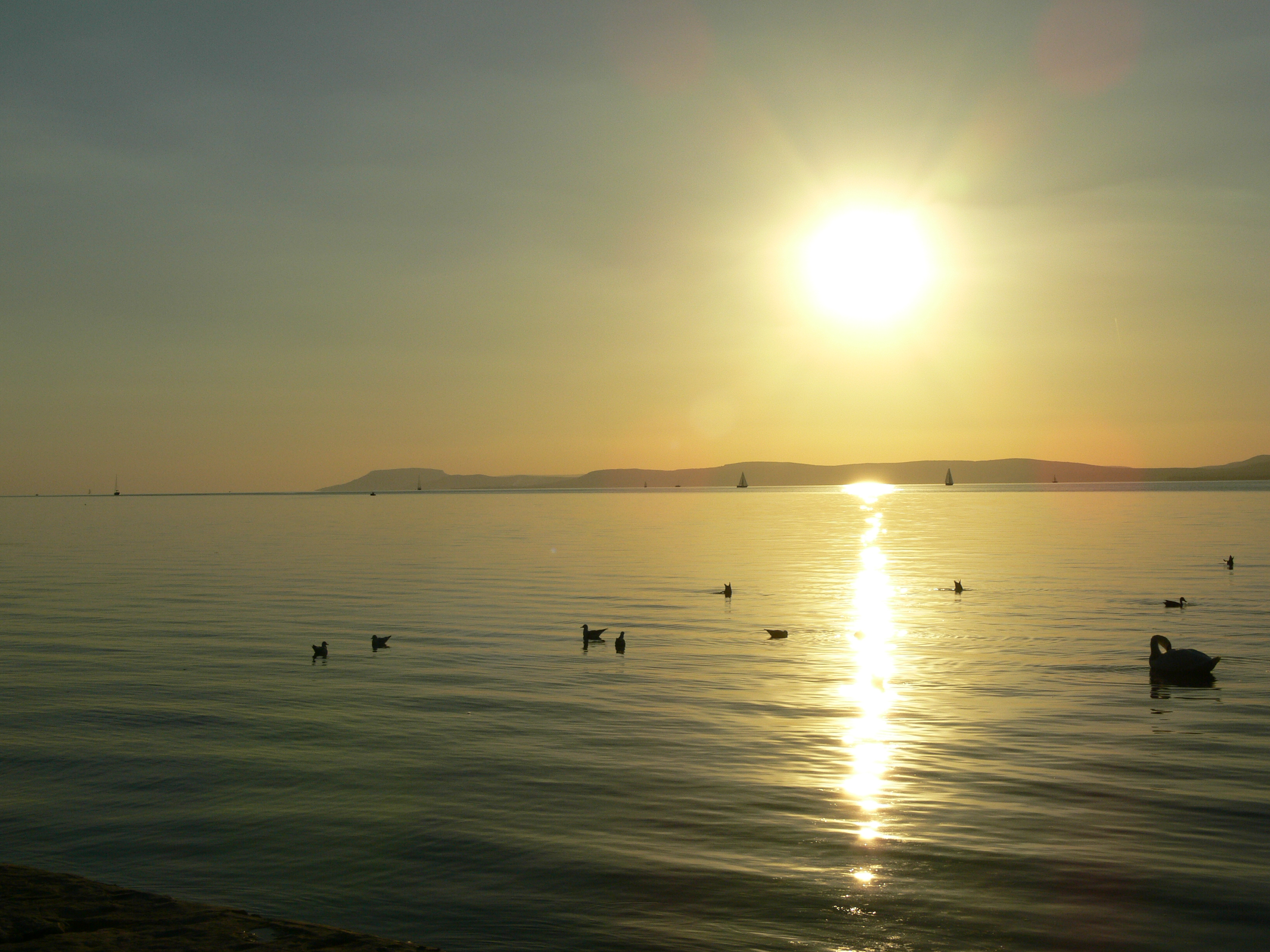
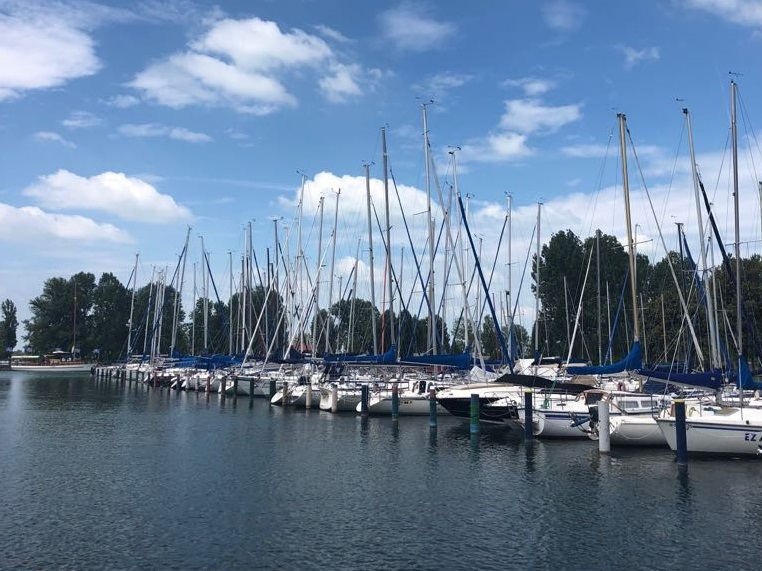
- Descending, from top: Logo of Balatonföldvár on the beach, East Beach, Long-distance cycling route, Loess, Port entrance, Visitor centre, sunset on the lake, Marina of Balatonföldvár

- Flag Coat of arms
- Nicknames: Flowery town of Lake Balaton, Queen of Balaton
- Location of Balatonföldvár
- Coordinates: 46.85469°N 17.88797°E
- Country: Hungary
- Region: Southern Transdanubia
- County: Somogy
- District: Siófok
- RC Diocese: Kaposvár
- Settled: 14th century
- Incorporated: 1893

Government
  - Mayor: Huba Holovits (Fidesz-KDNP)

Area
  - Total: 15.32 km^{2} (5.92 sq mi)
- Highest elevation: 208.2 m (683 ft)
- Lowest elevation: 104 m (341 ft)

Population (2017)
  - Total: 2,172
  - Density: 141.8/km^{2} (367.2/sq mi)
- Demonyms: földvári, balatonföldvári
- Time zone: UTC+1 (CET)
  - Summer (DST): UTC+2 (CEST)
- Postal code: 8623
- Area code: (+36) 84
- Patron Saint: Our Lady of Mount Carmel
- Motorways: M7
- Distance from Budapest: 120 km (75 mi) Northeast
- NUTS 3 code: HU232
- MP: Mihály Witzmann (Fidesz)
- Website: Balatonföldvár Online

Balatonföldvár (Hungarian pronunciation: [ˈbɒlɒtoɱføldvaːr], German: Földwahr) is a popular resort town in Somogy County, Hungary, on the southern side of Lake Balaton, approximately 120 km (75 mi) southwest from Budapest and about 23 km (14 mi) southwest from Siófok, the "capital of Balaton". Balatonföldvár is a frequently visited tourist destination among Hungarians and foreign guests (especially Germans and Austrians) because of its natural beauties (like the loess hill and the big flowery parks), historical heritages (such as the Celtic path, the old mansions and villas) or its countless leisure opportunities. The town offer several water sport (sailing, windsurfing, fishing, rowing etc.) and mainland sport (beach volleyball, bicycle pathes, football etc.) activities.

== Etymology ==
The origin of the name Balatonföldvár is from Lake Balaton, the lake bordering the town, and the földvár (in English earth castle). The földvár was built in the late Iron Age, during the occupation of the Celts. The well-preserved trenches and mounds of this structure are clearly visible on the magaspart (in English high shore, the area above the cliff).

The town is commonly referred to by locals simply as Földvár.

== History ==
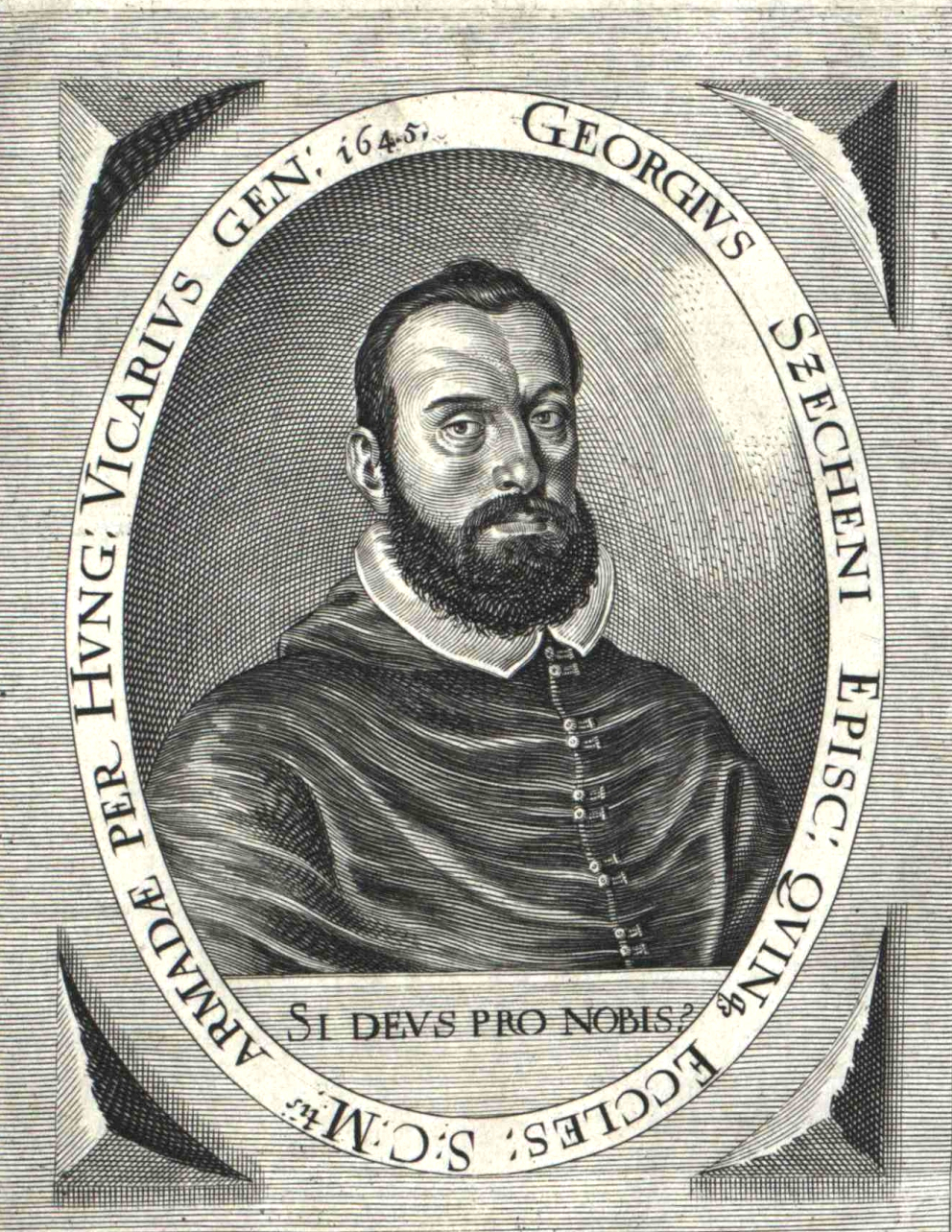
György Széchényi de Saár et Felsővidék (1605/1606-1695) bought Balatonföldvár and the surrounding villages in 1677.

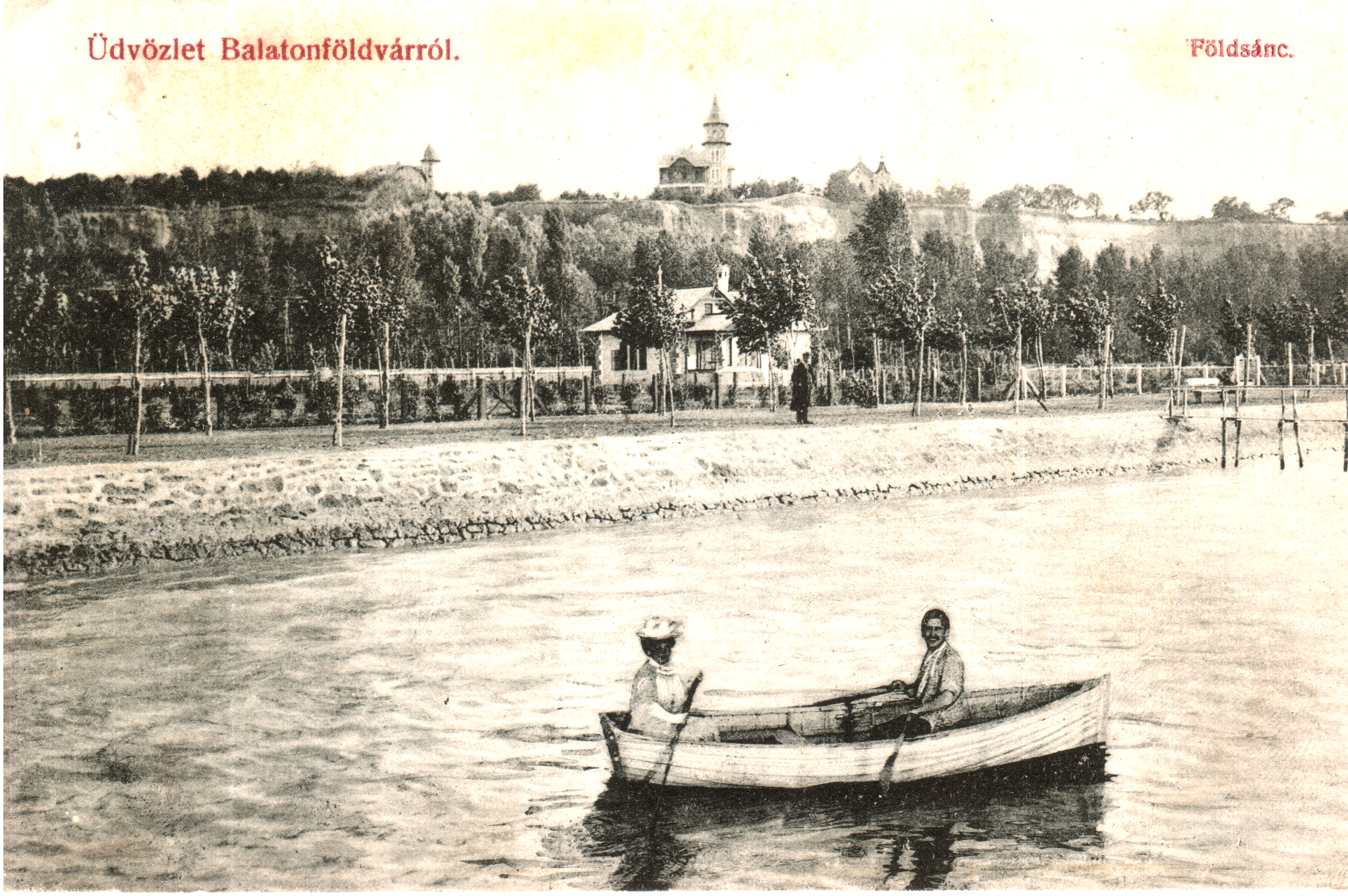
Lovers in a boat on the Lake Balaton in Balatonföldvár (1908)

In around the 4th century AD, the area was settled by Celts, who constructed the large Iron Age hill fort that gives Balatonföldvár its name, the remains of which are still visible today.

The region around Lake Balaton was occupied in around 180 AD by the Romans and was situated on a military road from Aquincum (part of present-day Budapest) to the Italian Peninsula. This road was considered an important road of the Roman province of Pannonia. Pannonia incorporates the area occupied by modern-day Hungary west of the Danube.

The earliest recorded use of the name 'Földvár' was in documents from the 11th century. The word appears again in written form in 1358.

In the 14th and 15th centuries, the area of today's Balatonföldvár consisted mostly of pasture land. In terms of jurisdiction, it was attached to the settlement of Kőröshegy, located about three kilometers south of the lake.

The entire region surrounding Kőröshegy was purchased by Archbishop György Széchényi de Saár et Felsővidék in 1677.

The town was referred to as 'Földvárpuszta' on maps between the 17th–19th centuries that recorded the land belonging to the Széchényi Family.

The Széchényi family doctor, Professor Frigyes Korányi, first proposed creating a bathing resort in the area of Földvár. Adopting this suggestion, Earl Imre Széchényi had the land divided into sections in 1894. The construction was organized by István Spur, the engineer of the Széchényi estate, and József Schilán, the gardener.

The Földvár bathing resort was officially opened in 1896, and received its present name, Balatonföldvár, that same year. Over 40 large villas were constructed for the wealthy and influential members of society, including the aristocracy, military officers, and politicians.

Hungary's loss of the Adriatic Shore following the First World War caused a rekindling of interest in the bathing resorts around Lake Balaton such as Balatonföldvár. As a result, development of the town continued between the First and Second World Wars. During this time, number of renowned Hungarians enjoyed the facilities offered by the town. These included Gizi Bajor, Kálmán Kandó, László Németh, Jenő and Szidi Rákosi, Jenő Kvassay, Lőrinc Szabó, and György Ránki.

Following the Second World War, further development took place in Balatonföldvár. The town was deemed a 'township with independent administration' in 1949. Larger scale development took place along the areas bordering the lake. Hotels, corporate and private resorts, flats, restaurants and shops were built. An open-air stage was erected, as well as a cultural centre and an open-air cinema. In keeping with the philosophy of the time, Hotel Festival, a concrete hotel comprising two eight-storey blocks was constructed in 1976.

In 1985, Balatonföldvár became a township, and later in 1992 it became a town. Balatonföldvár later became the centre of the Somogy region.

The oldest known building in Balatonföldvár was said to be the Földvári Csárda (the 'Földvár Inn'). This inn was said to have existed from about the middle of the 18th century to the late 19th century. The old Földvár Inn was eventually demolished and a new one was built in its place. The Holovits family rented the building, enlarged it, and eventually established a modern restaurant and a small hotel.

The design and management of the Balatonföldvár gardens was later adopted by the horticulturalist Ilona Jordanits. Her efforts helped Balatonföldvár win a European Competition for 'Towns and Villages in Bloom' in 1994 and the 'Entente Florale Europe' in 1995.

== Main sights and attractions ==
=== The Iron Age Hill Fort ===
The large Celtic Iron Age Hill Fort after which Balatonföldvár was named was in use until around the 4th century BCE. The mounds and ditches of the fort are mostly well preserved, and are clearly visible on the high shore of the town.

The fort forms an isosceles triangular structure viewed from the air, with two of the sides significantly longer than the third. The cliff between the high shore and the low shore parallel to and above Kemping Utca ('Camping Street') formed a natural defensive wall and was one of the long sides to the fort. The other long side to the fort consists of huge man made mounds and ditches, running for several hundred meters from the National Flag (1936) (corner of Kelta Stny and Kilátó Köz) roughly West to East as far as a point across the other side of the main Budapest road to where the Kínai Üzlet ('Chinese Shop') now stands. The mounds and ditches are particularly clearly visible at the higher end of Petőfi Sándor Utca next to the chapel (1897) on Kelta Sétány (literally 'Celtic Walk', named after the fort). The third, shorter, side, runs from the location of the current Kínai Üzlet to the cliff, approximately at the lower end of Petőfi Sándor Utca. Unfortunately, the lower end of the fort has not been well preserved, and many of the mounds and ditches that were visible and recorded on maps as late as the late 19th century have been destroyed through the construction of buildings. It seems that the preservation of the cultural history has not been a priority of the local municipality.

=== Petőfi Sándor Utca ===
Several notable buildings are situated on Petőfi Sándor Utca, which was previously known as Imre Street. Number 1 Petőfi Sándor Utca was formerly the mansion of Jenő Rákosi, and an established meeting point for poets and writers for many years. The wooden Székely Gate next door was given to Balatonföldvár by one of its twin towns Zetelaka in 1995. Number 9 Petőfi Sándor Utca is 'Kulpintyó', the former residence of Zsigmond Széchényi, a famous writer and hunter who was also a member of the famous Széchényi family. Number 11 Petőfi Sándor Utca was the residence of Gizi Bajor, a notable actress and member of the National Theatre. An avenue in the town and the community centre (1994) were named after her. Number 13 Petőfi Sándor Utca (1896) is one of the most notable buildings in town, given that it belonged to Professor Friges Korányi, doctor to the Széchényi family, whose idea it was to develop the area of Balatonföldvár as a bathing resort. This building is built in a Neo-Roman style.

=== Balatonföldvár Harbor ===
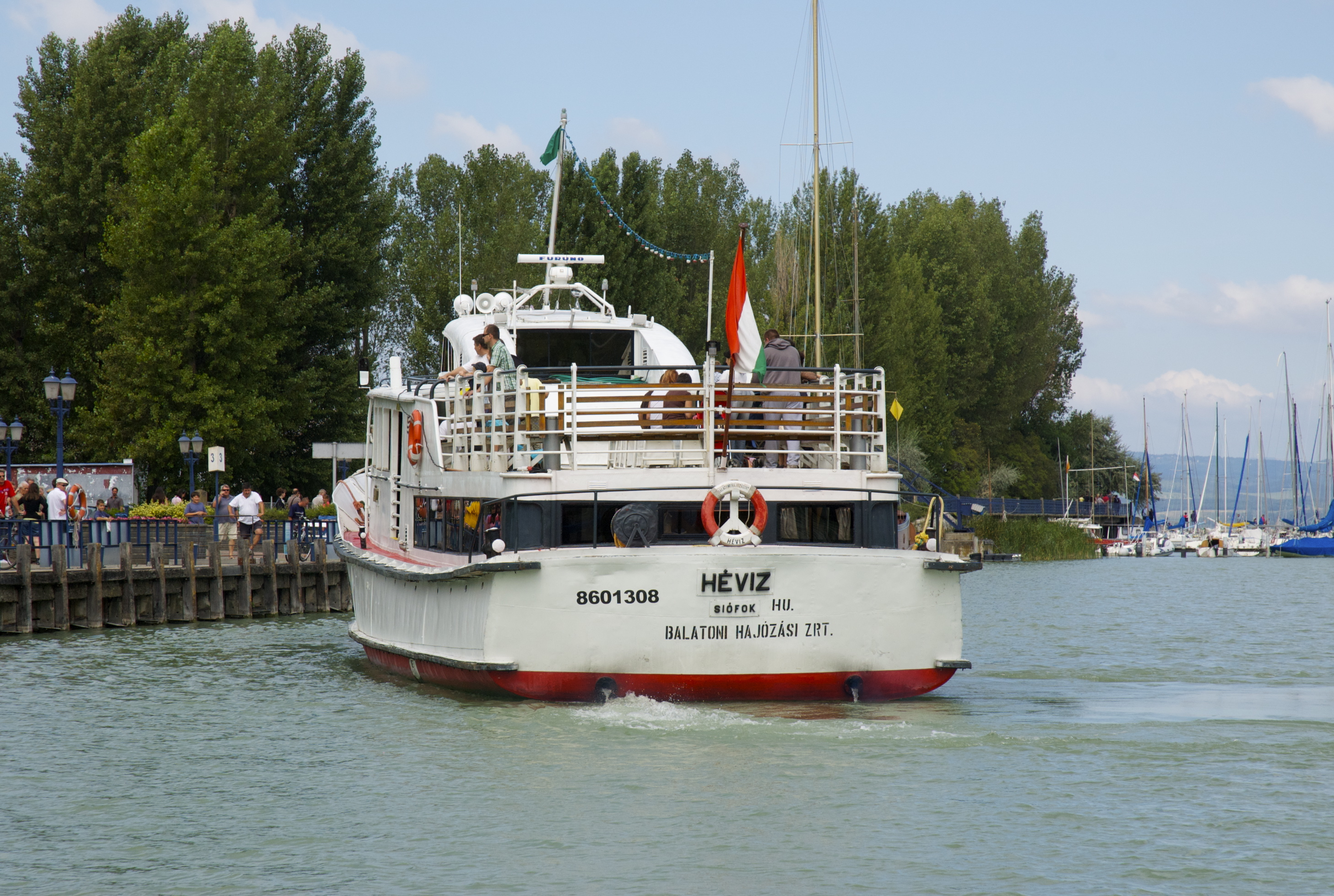
The Hévíz Ship in the harbour

Harbor and Galamb sziget (Pigeon Island)

The Harbor entrance

Kwassay Walkway

The port was opened in 1905 and is still one of the largest harbours around Lake Balaton. Two curved piers provide a protected harbor for yachts, boats and ships. The material dredged in order to create the harbour was used to build an artificial island. This artificial island is called Galamb Sziget ('Pigeon Island'). The name is derived from the decorative dovecotes mounted on pillars on the small bridge used to cross from the mainland to the island. The island has a number of poplar trees and footpaths and is home to the local sailing club.

The western pier is accessible via a 102 m-long (335 ft) reinforced concrete bridge, Hungary's only footbridge with multiple supports, and a listed industrial monument.

After the Communist takeover of Hungary (1948), the area of the Galamb Sziget, the hotel close by and the eastern pier were made inaccessible to the general public. This area was reserved for Communist Party members who came there for the summer holidays. Because of the high security, the area acquired a special air of mystique.

After the regime change in the early 1990s, the authorities opened up this area to the public. However, the eastern pier is not currently accessible to the public.

=== Balatonföldvár Promenade ===
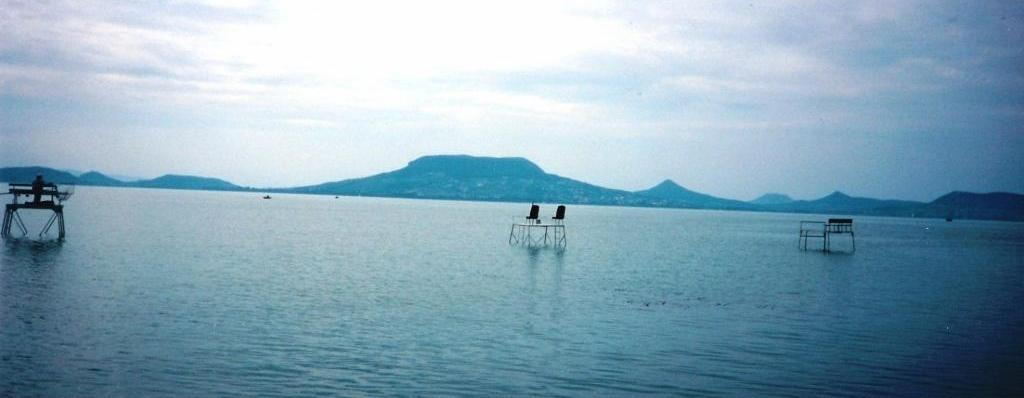
Badacsony Mountain

Balatonföldvár is embellished with two rows of trees along the western side of the town. The views extend across the lake to the northern shore, where several hills and the flat-topped Badascony mountain can be observed. Hills of the Tihany Peninsula are visible at a closer distance. During the summer, lavender fields on the lower slopes lead to a purple hue to the landscape.

=== Calvary of Balatonföldvár ===
STATIO I	STATIO II	STATIO III	STATIO IV	STATIO V	STATIO VI	STATIO VII
STATIO VIII	STATIO IX	STATIO X	STATIO XI	STATIO XII	STATIO XIII	STATIO XIV

== Economy ==
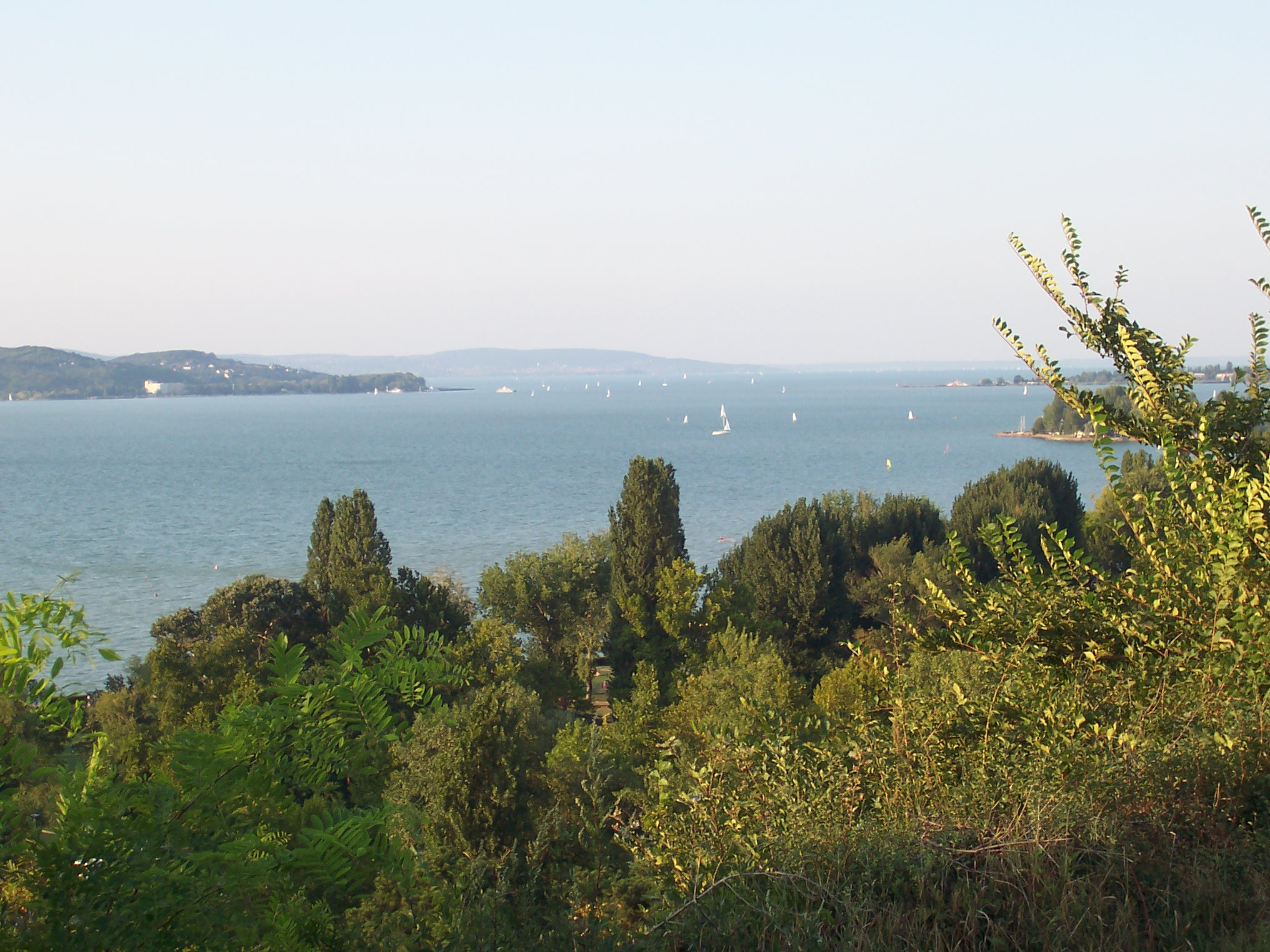
The view of Lake Balaton from the top of the loess hill in Balatonföldvár

The main income source of the town is tourism. Most tourists visit Balatonföldvár during the warmer summer time.

== Railway Station ==
Balatonföldvár station is on the mainline between Budapest and Nagykanizsa. It is also situated on the main railway line to Zagreb, making it easily connected to a variety of international destinations. The station building was built in 1928. In the pre-war days it was an imposing building, well proportioned and symmetrical, painted in yellow and kept immaculately clean.

== Present ==
Balatonföldvár is a major tourist destination, not only for Hungarians, but also for tourists from other European countries. There are close to eighty hotels and privately rented apartments available for the visitor. The town's infrastructure is modern, with water treatment and sewerage plant, cable TV, wireless service, good roads, walking paths, parks, medical service, restaurants, pharmacy and shops. Cultural life is prolific, with music recitals being offered in the Roman Catholic Church, open-air theatre and other venues. The town is often used as a venue for conferences.

== Climate ==
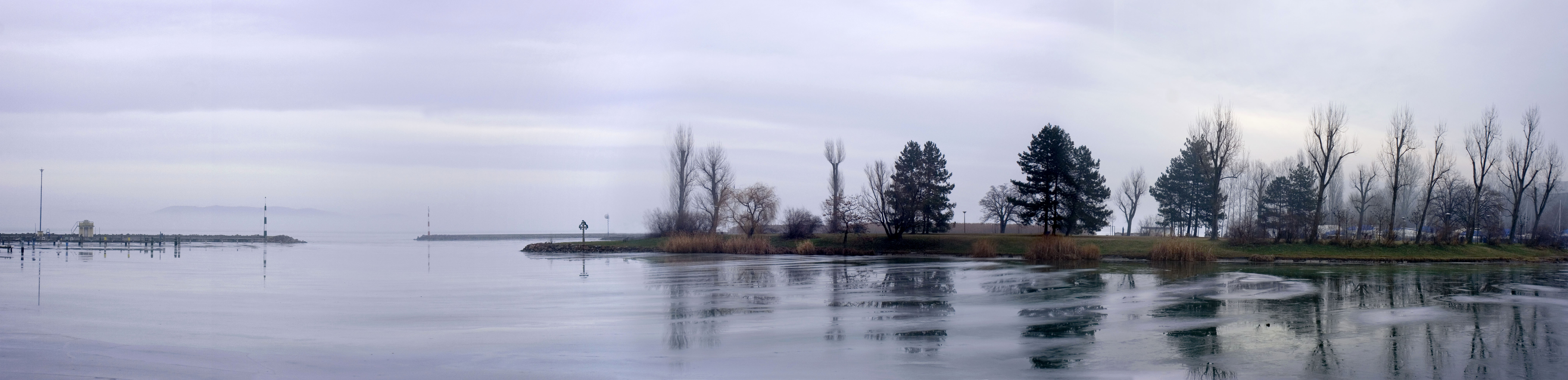
The Harbor in winter

The closest city to Balatonföldvár is Siófok which has weather records and averages on [[url=http://www.wheatherbase.com/|Weatherbase]]

Climate data for Siofok
Month	Jan	Feb	Mar	Apr	May	Jun	Jul	Aug	Sep	Oct	Nov	Dec	Year
Mean daily maximum °C (°F)	2 (35)	3 (38)	9 (48)	14 (57)	20 (68)	23 (73)	25 (77)	24 (76)	21 (69)	14 (58)	7 (44)	3 (38)	14 (57)
Mean daily minimum °C (°F)	−2 (28)	−2 (29)	3 (37)	7 (45)	12 (54)	16 (60)	17 (63)	17 (62)	13 (56)	8 (46)	3 (37)	−1 (31)	8 (46)
Average precipitation mm (inches)	41 (1.6)	33 (1.3)	36 (1.4)	38 (1.5)	58 (2.3)	61 (2.4)	33 (1.3)	58 (2.3)	43 (1.7)	33 (1.3)	48 (1.9)	46 (1.8)	530 (20.8)
Source: Weatherbase

== Notable residents ==
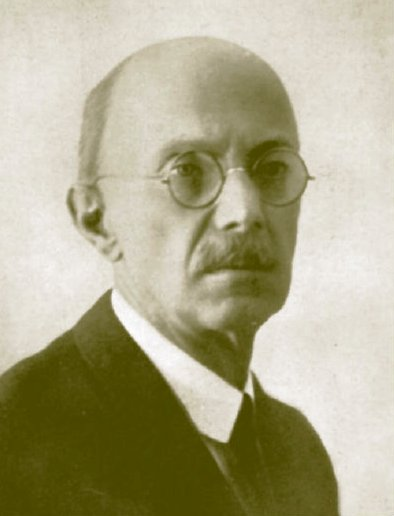
Kálmán Kandó (1869-1931)

- Frigyes Korányi (1828-1913), Hungarian physician specializing in internal medicine, especially pulmonary medicine; father of Frigyes Korányi, Jr., a Hungarian politician and Minister of Finance.
- Gizi Bajor (1893-1951), Hungarian actress
- Kálmán Kandó(1869-1931), Hungarian engineer and a pioneer in the development of electric railway traction
- László Németh (1901-1975), Hungarian dentist, writer, dramatist and essayist
- Lőrinc Szabó (1900-1957), Hungarian poet and literary translator
- György Ránki (1907-1992), Hungarian composer
- Sándor Jemnitz (1890-1963), Hungarian composer, conductor, music critic and author died here
- Katalin Karády (1910-1990), Hungarian actress and singer, an awardee of the Righteous among the Nations honorific for rescuing a number of Hungarian Jews
- Gyula Illyés (1902-1983), Hungarian poet and novelist
- Alexander Voytovych (1971-), Ukrainian contemporary artist
- István Telegdy (1927-2013), Hungarian Olympian sailor and trainer, technical leader for the Spartacus Sailing Club of Balatonföldvár

== Relations ==
=== Twin towns – sister cities ===
Town	Country	Flag	Year
Gaienhofen	Germany	(Germany)	1991
Steckborn	Switzerland	(Switzerland)	1991
Saint-Georges-de-Didonne	France	(France)	?
Kühbach	Germany	(Germany)	?
Ylöjärvi	Finland	(Finland)	?
Zetelaka	Romania	(Romania)	?

== Földvárs' Cooperation (2000) ==
Hungarian settlements bearing the word földvár in their name (listed below) signed a cultural cooperation agreement in 2000. In 2003, the cooperation was expanded by two new foreign towns (Bácsföldvár, Serbia and Melegföldvár, Romania). Within this framework, a meeting is held annually on various sites hosting the representatives of the member towns.

- Dunaföldvár, Tolna
- Tiszaföldvár, Jász-Nagykun-Szolnok
- Pusztaföldvár, Békés
- Balatonföldvár
- Bácsföldvár (Serbian: Bačko Gradište), Vojvodina, Serbia
- Melegföldvár (Romanian: Feldioara), part of the municipality of Katona (Romanian: Comuna Cătina), in Cluj County, Romania

== Gallery ==
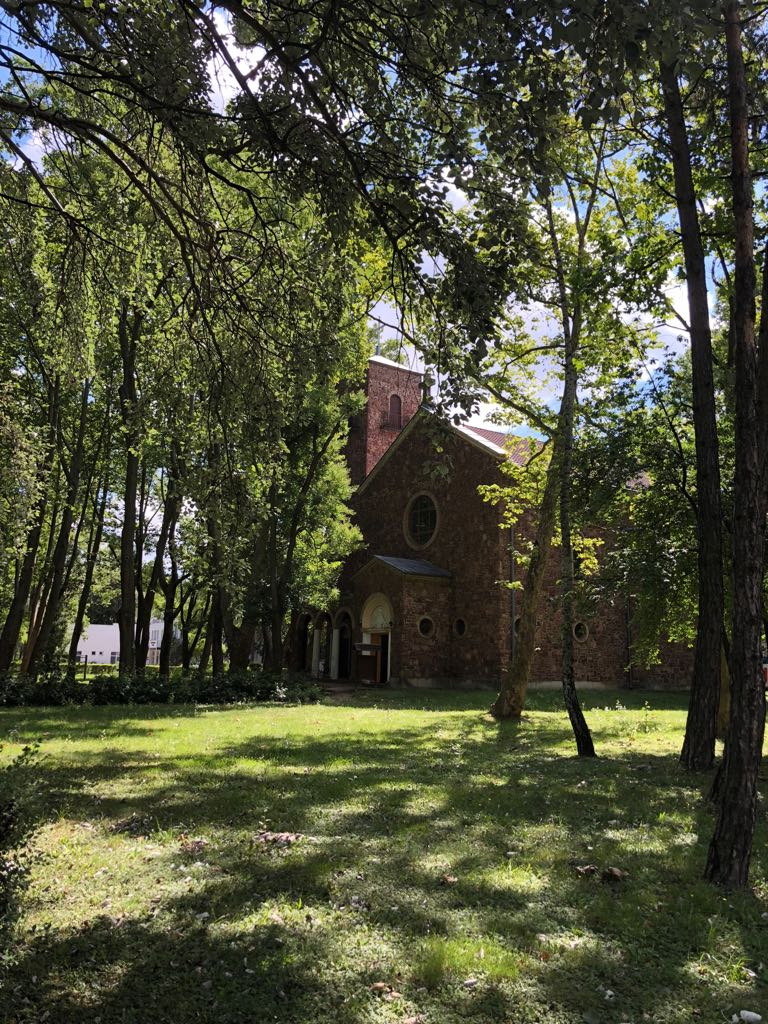
Holy Cross church in Balatonföldvár (built in 1944 by László Irsy)

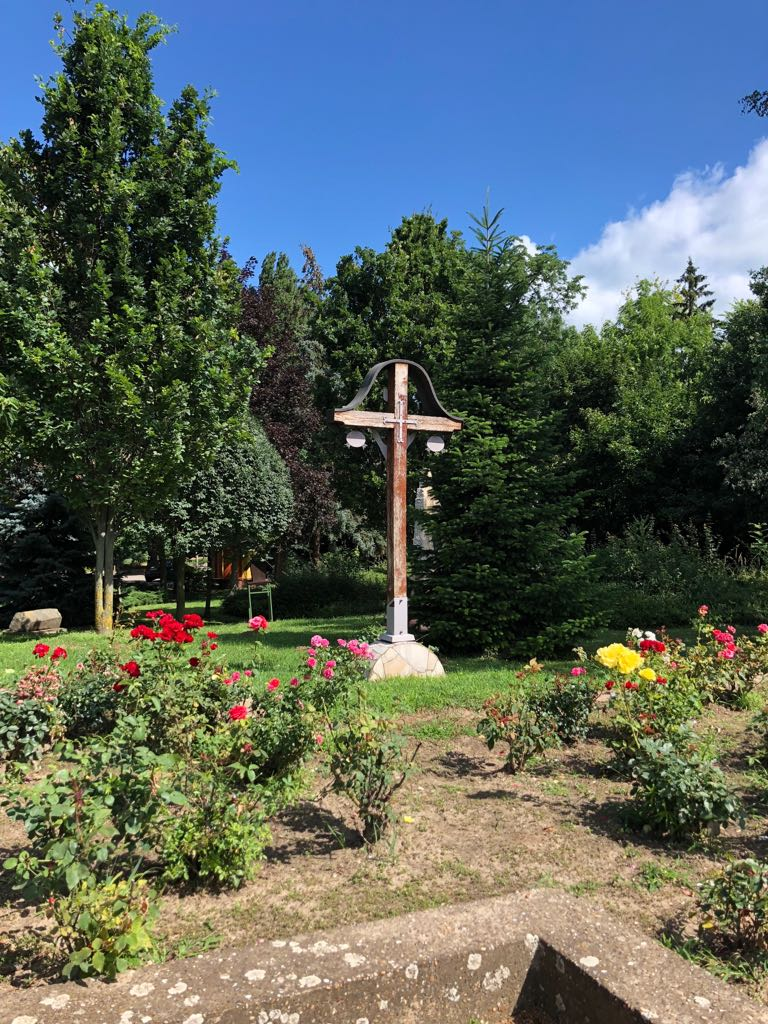
Holy Cross in Balatonföldvár

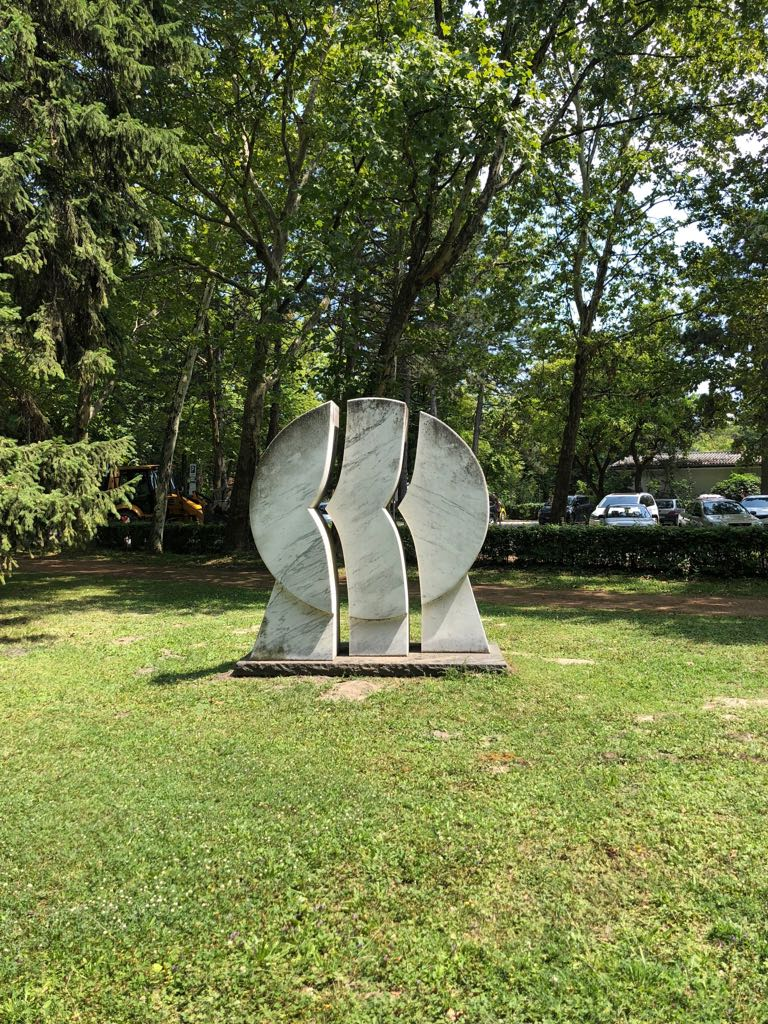
Millennial monument by József Seregi in 2000 in Balatonföldvár

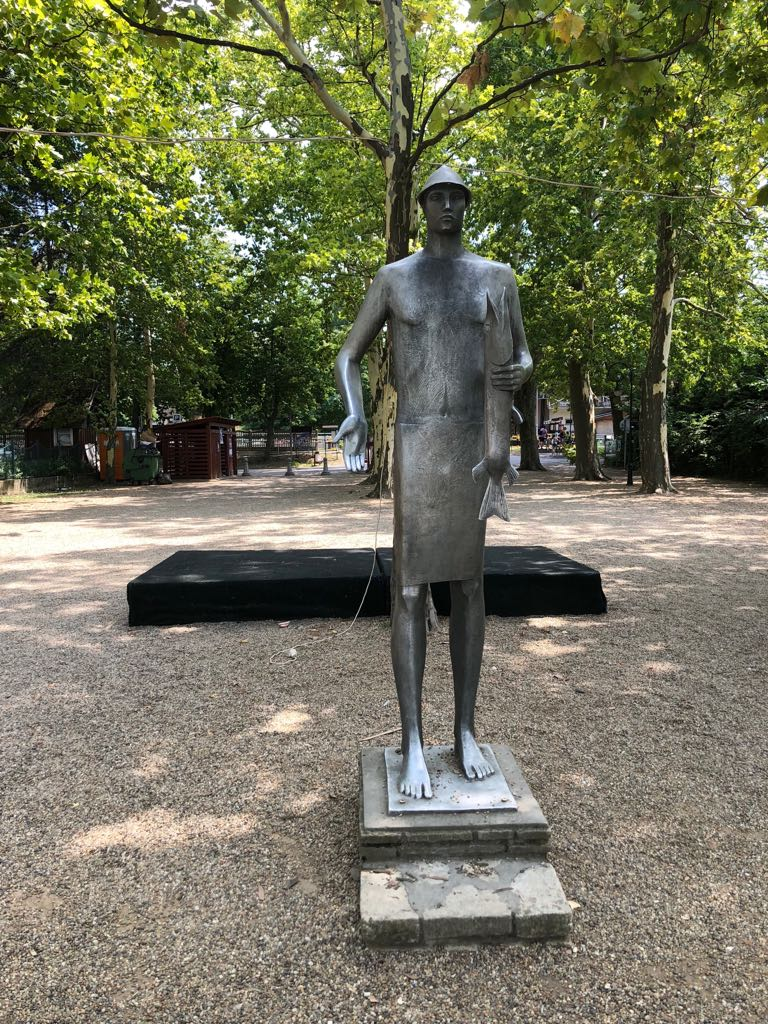
Fisherman by István Bors in Balatonföldvár

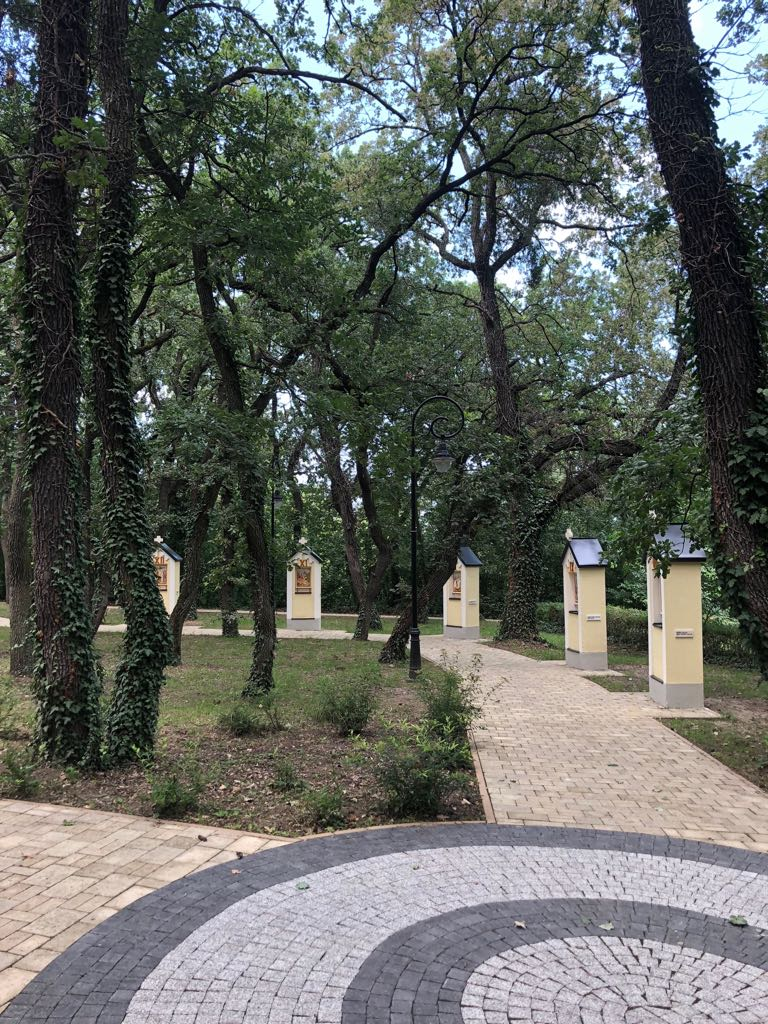
Calvary of Balatonföldvár (erected in 2018)

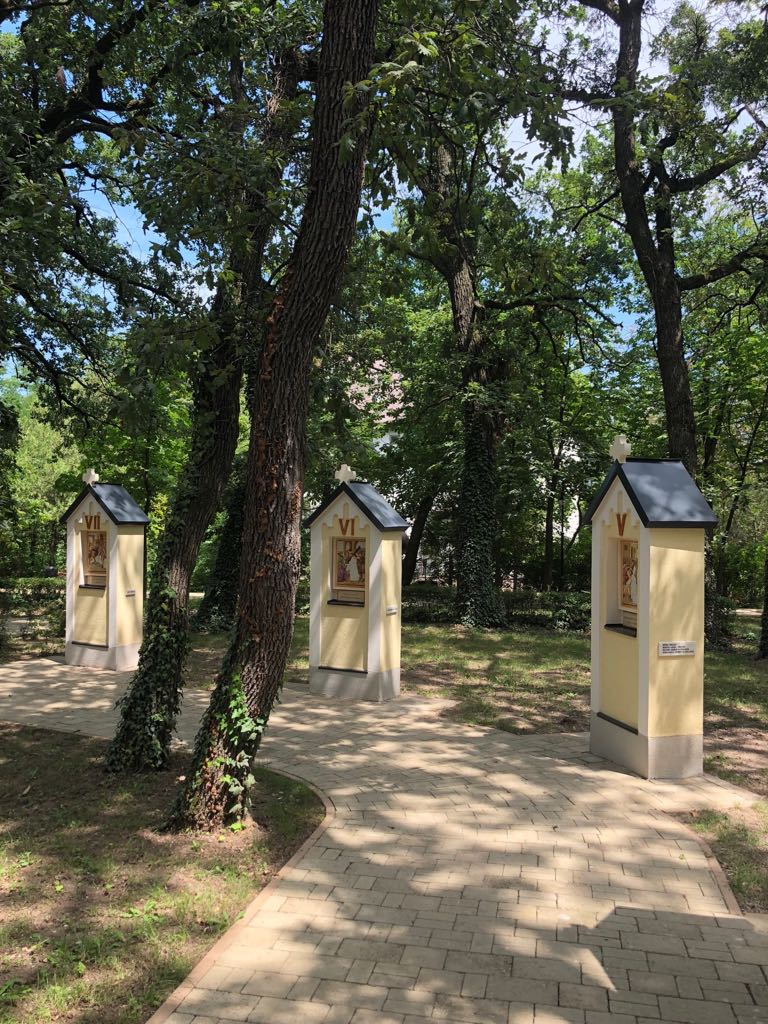
Calvary of Balatonföldvár (erected in 2018)

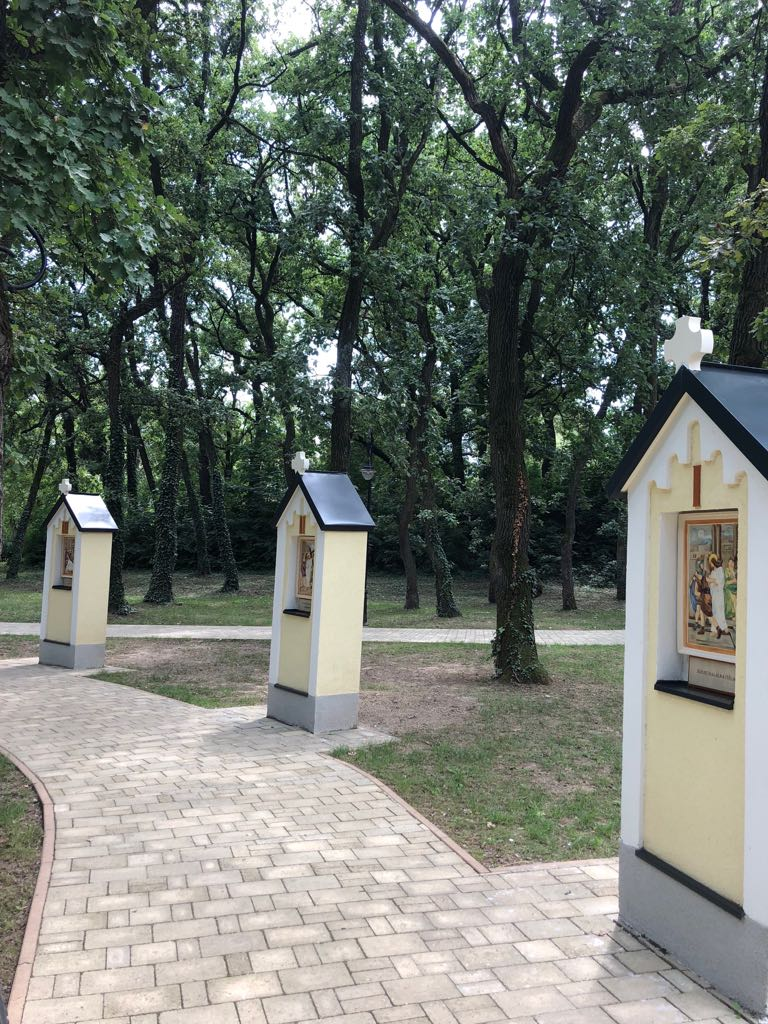
Calvary of Balatonföldvár (erected in 2018)

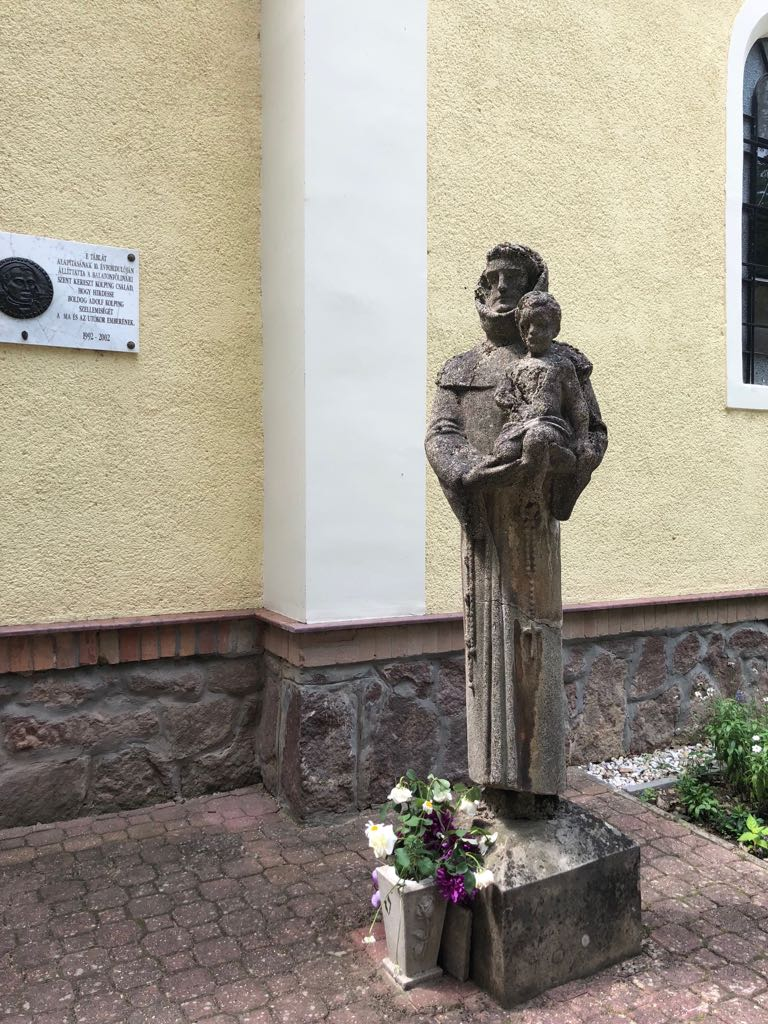
Statue of Adolph Kolping in Balatonföldvár erected in 2002

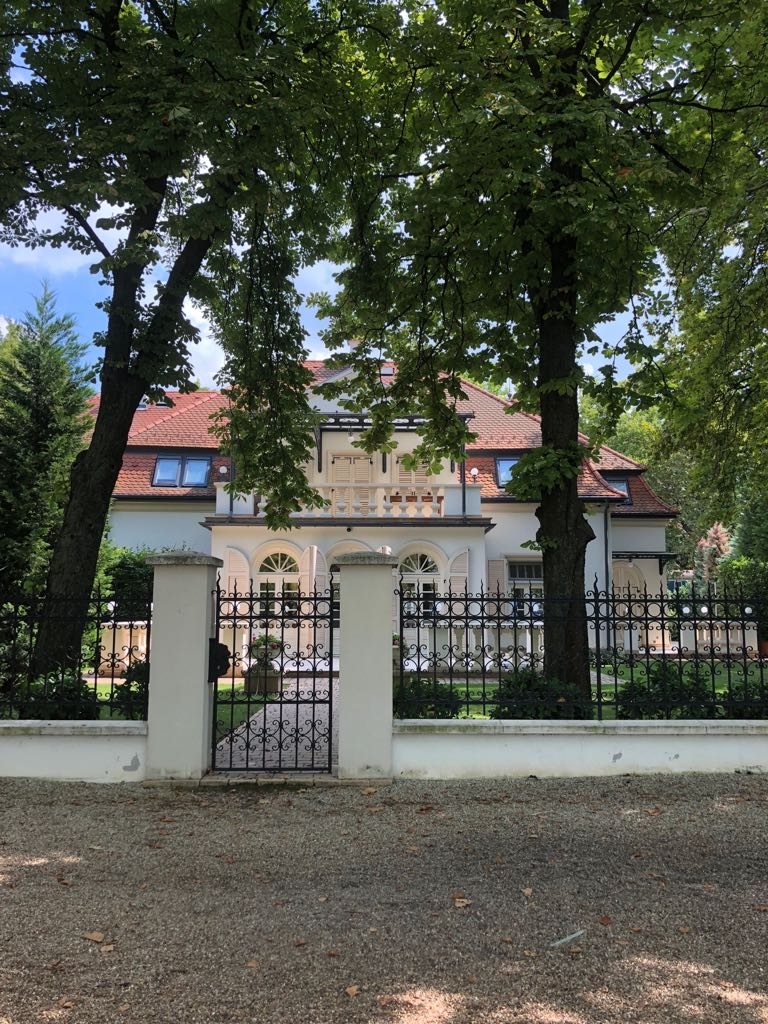
Villa in Balatonföldvár

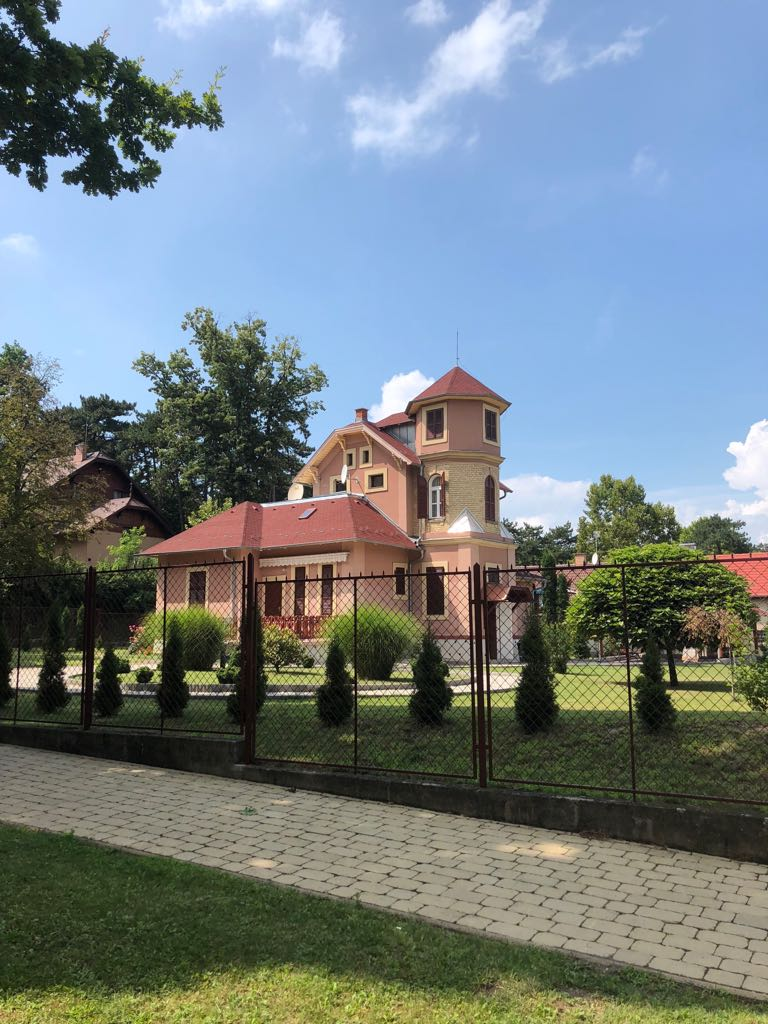
Villa in Balatonföldvár

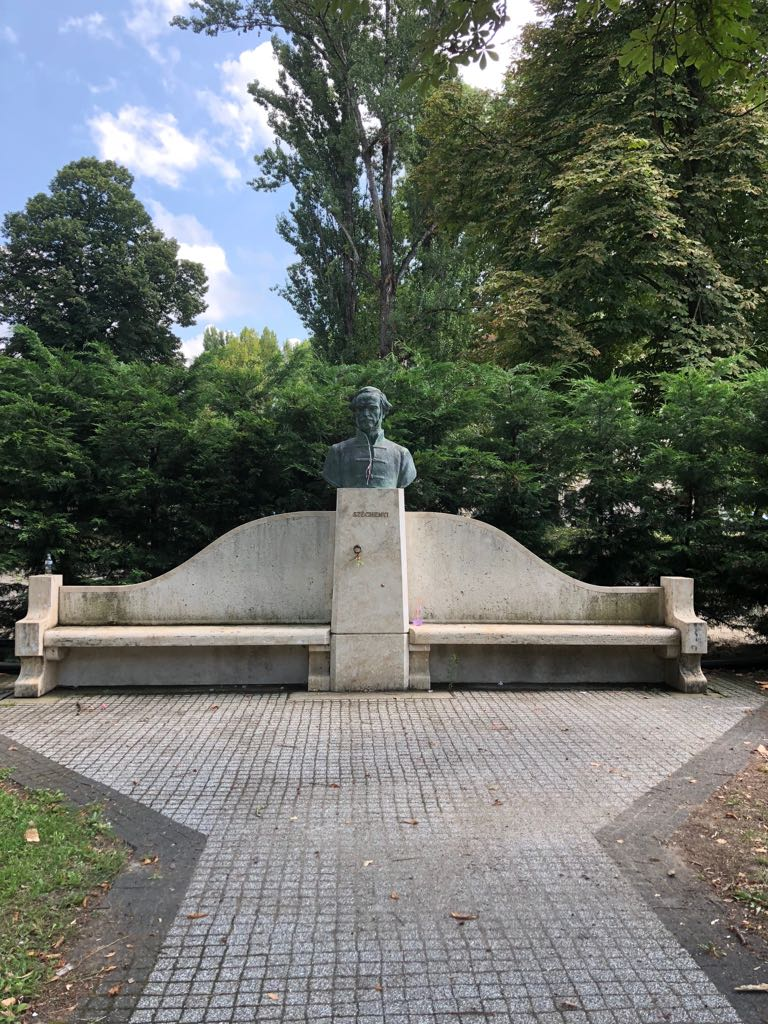
Széchenyi Statue in Balatonföldvár
