= Katona =

Katona is a Hungarian surname meaning "soldier".

== People ==
- András Katona (1938–2026), Hungarian water polo player
- Ervin Katona (born 1977), Serbian strongman competitor
- Gábor Katona (born 1952), Hungarian triple jumper
- George Katona (1901–1981), Hungarian-born American psychologist
- Gyula O. H. Katona (born 1941), Hungarian mathematician
- Gyula Y. Katona (born 1965), Hungarian mathematician, son of Gyula O. H.
- Iggy Katona (1916–2003), American stock car racer
- Jacqui Katona, environmental and cultural protection activist
- József Katona (1792–1830), Hungarian playwright and poet
- Kálmán Katona (1948–2017), Hungarian politician
- Kerry Katona (born 1980), TV presenter, writer, columnist and pop singer
- Klári Katona (born 1953), Hungarian singer
- Mary Katona (died 1982), American politician
- Nándor Katona (1864–1932), Hungarian-Slovak painter
- Nisha Katona (born 1971), British barrister, celebrity chef and restaurateur
- Péter Katona, member of the guitar duo Katona Twins
- Sándor Katona (1935–2023), Hungarian glider aerobatic pilot
- Sándor Katona (1943–2009), Hungarian association footballer
- Tamás Katona (1932–2013), Hungarian politician, historian
- Zoltán Katona, member of the guitar duo Katona Twins

== Places ==
- Katona is the Hungarian name for Cătina Commune, Cluj County, Romania

== See also ==
- Katonah (disambiguation)
