= Hagău =

Hagău may refer to several villages in Romania:

- Hagău, a village in Cătina Commune, Cluj County
- Hagău, a village in Râciu Commune, Mureș County
