= Cătina =

Cătina may refer to several places in Romania:

- Cătina, a commune in Buzău County
- Cătina, a commune in Cluj County
- Cătina, a village in Florești Commune, Prahova County
