= Katonah (disambiguation) =

Katonah may refer to:

- Katonah (Native American leader)
- Katonah, New York, a hamlet within the town of Bedford
- Katonah (album), a music album by Apollo Sunshine, named after the above hamlet

== See also ==
- Katona
