= Alexander Voytovych =

Alexander Voytoych
- Born: 1971 (age 54–55); Lviv, Ukraine
- Education: L'viv Decorative and Applied Art College named after Iv. Trush and the Lviv National Academy of Arts
- Known for: Oil painting, Drawing

Alexander (Oleksandr) Voytovych (Ukrainian: Олександр Войтович; born 1971 in Lviv) is a Ukrainian contemporary artist. Figurative painting characterizes the majority of his work, and portrait and naked model painting are two main themes of his art.

== Biography ==
Alexander Voytovych was educated at Lviv Decorative and Applied Art College named after Ivan Trush and the Lviv National Academy of Arts.

== Exhibitions ==
- 1994 "One for all", National Museum in L'viv, Ukraine
- 1995-1996 International Plein Airs, Budapest
- 1997-2000 Uzhgorod Picture Gallery, Ukraine, Uzhhorod
- 1998 "Art at the turn of millennia", Museum of Ethnography and Art Crafts NAS of Ukraine, L'viv<
- 1999 The first author's project "Inspiratio" of art group "Polychrome" - visual penetration into the past and transformation in contemporary secret. The project generated considerable excitement and mixed reviews, Art-Cultural Center "Dzyga"
- 2000 Laureate of "Autumn salon" diptych by "objective reality" in collaboration with Ivanka Voytovych, L'viv Palace of Arts, Ukraine
- 2000 Lviv's portrait exhibition "Persona", L'viv Palace of Arts, Ukraine
- 2001 One-man exhibition "Capriccio…" — grotesque eroticism against Galician conservatism, gallery "Gerdan", Lviv
- 2002-2004 Exhibitions in Spain
  - Charity Project "Originales Solidarios", Barcelona-Valencia, Spain
  - One-man exhibition, La Galeria de Soledad Arroyo Gill, Toledo, Spain
  - Centro Municipal de las Artes de Alcorcon, Madrid
  - Galeria Nova Rua, Lugo
  - I PREMIO INTERNACIONAL de ARTES PLASTICAS "Aires de Cordoba", a prize drawing and One-man exhibition in the gallery "Aires de Cordoba", Córdoba, Spain
- 2003 One-man exhibition "Women’s whims", Budapest, Hungary
- 2003 "Absinthe and Absence - a sweet Taste of Decadence" Art-Cultural Center "Soviart", Kyiv, Ukraine
- 2003-2006 Exhibitions in Poland
  - "Lemkowskie Jeruzalem", Gorlice — Kraków — Wrocław
  - International Triennial of Painting "Silver Square", Przemyśl
  - "Lwowskie klimaty", gallery BWA, Kielce
- 2004 Erotic Art Exhibition "Apple from Eva", gallery "Uzhgorod", Uzhgorod, Ukraine
  - Minoritenkloster, Tulln, Austria
- 2005 PREMIO WEB COLOR 2005, award in the category painting, gallery "Kleinos", Italy
  - Project Gallery Antiquity "Three crowns", Lviv — Kyiv
- 2006 Together with the poet Alexander Gavrosh edition of poetry collection "A BODY OF AN ARCHERESS", is an attempt to recreate a myth about a perfect Woman with man's hands – hands of a poet Alexander Gavrosh and an artist Alexander Voytovych
- 2006-2009 A series of personal art projects
  - "Allegory on high heels", gallery "Green sofa", Lviv
  - "ECSTASY Exiting daily routine" — sacrality appeal to the idea that the body is experiencing ecstasy and attempt to understand the nature of ecstasy, Museum of ideas, Lviv
  - " Salome is not only…Kyiv Academic Young Theatre
  - "Noble Entertaining In Ten Portraits" - find the perfect female image through the noble identity, Museum of ideas, Lviv
  - "Things from Lviv", gallery "Silver Bells", Kyiv
- 2007-2008 The idea and organization of erotic art projects "Taming Eros" - male and female format, gallery "Green Sofa", Lviv
  - "Grotesque in modern art", Museum of Ethnography and Art Crafts NAS of Ukraine, L'viv
  - "My Lviv", Center for Urban History of East Central Europe, Lviv
  - "Art — Kyiv", Ukrainian House, Kyiv
- 2009 Open their own gallery "Art Atelier Voytovych" Lviv presenting collections of paintings, drawings and decors from Ivanka and Alexander Voytovych
  - Exhibition of Contemporary Ukrainian Art Bucharest, Embassy of Ukraine, Romania
  - "НюАнс", L'viv Palace of Arts, Ukraine
- 2009-2010 International Plein Airs in Hungary, Balatonföldvár and Vac
- 2010 One-man exhibitions
  - "КаvART", "Svit kavy", Lviv
  - "A Mysterious Portrait", Art Atelier Voytovych, Lviv

== Bibliography ==
- International Painting Triennial of Carpathian Region Silver Quadrangle. — Przemyśl: San-Set, 2006 — P. 86. ISBN 83-905953-3-8
- Ivanka és Alexander Voytovics festőművész család // Fészekrakó. — 2003. —III.évfolyam 1.szám — P. 3, 58–59. HU ISSN 1587-1304
- Voytovych trae an Aires sus elegantes figuras // Diario Córdoba. — 2004. — 18 de septiembre. — p. 54.
- Bodnar O./Боднар О. — Л. Тайна втілення. — Ужгород: Карпати, 2009. — P. 237–239. — fоtо: p. 227, 270.ISBN 978-966-671-179-6
- Gavrosh A./Гаврош О. Тіло лучниці. — Л.:Піраміда, 2006. — 56 с. — Ілюстрації: О.Войтович. ISBN 966-8522-69-6
- Didyk N./Дідик Н. Fundamentals of composition. — Ужгород: Мистецька лінія, 2009. — С.44. ISBN 978-966-8764-96-7
- Kosmolinska N./Космолінська Н. Art chat on "Green sofa" // FINE ART. — 2009. — No. 4. — P. 114 — 115.
- Chervatiuk L./Черватюк Л. Women's image in the Ukrainian modern art. — К.: Навчальна книга, 2007. — P. 33 — 34.ISBN 978-966-329-110-9
- Shumylovych B./Шумилович Б. Women, paintings and allegories in high heels. // Образотворче мистецтво. — 2008. — No. 4. — P. 92 — 93.
