= Nándor Katona =

Hungarian painter

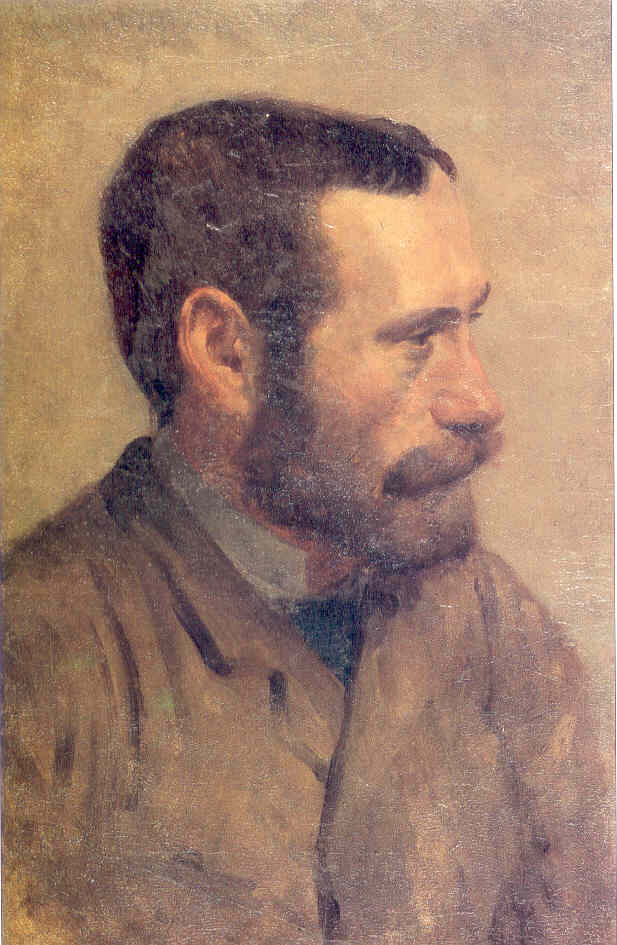
Nándor Katona, probable self-portrait

Katona Nándor, or Nathan Ferdinand Kleinberger (12 September 1864 – 1 August 1932), was a Hungarian painter.

Katona was born Szepesófalu (Spišská Stará Ves) in the Kingdom of Hungary, now part of Slovakia. He was of one of seven children of a dismally poor Hungarian Jewish family. An artistic child prodigy, he was instructed in painting by László Mednyánszky. He later studied in Budapest and Paris, and traveled extensively throughout Western Europe.

Most of his works depict scenes of nature from his home region, the Szepes county (Spiš) – in particular views of the Tatra Mountains and the area of Késmárk (Kežmarok), which he considered his home town despite having spent much of his life in Budapest. He died in Budapest in 1932.

His works are on exhibit at the Hungarian National Gallery in Budapest, the Slovak National Gallery, the Eastern Slovak Gallery in Kassa (Košice), and the Tatra Gallery in Poprad.
