= Jenő Kvassay =

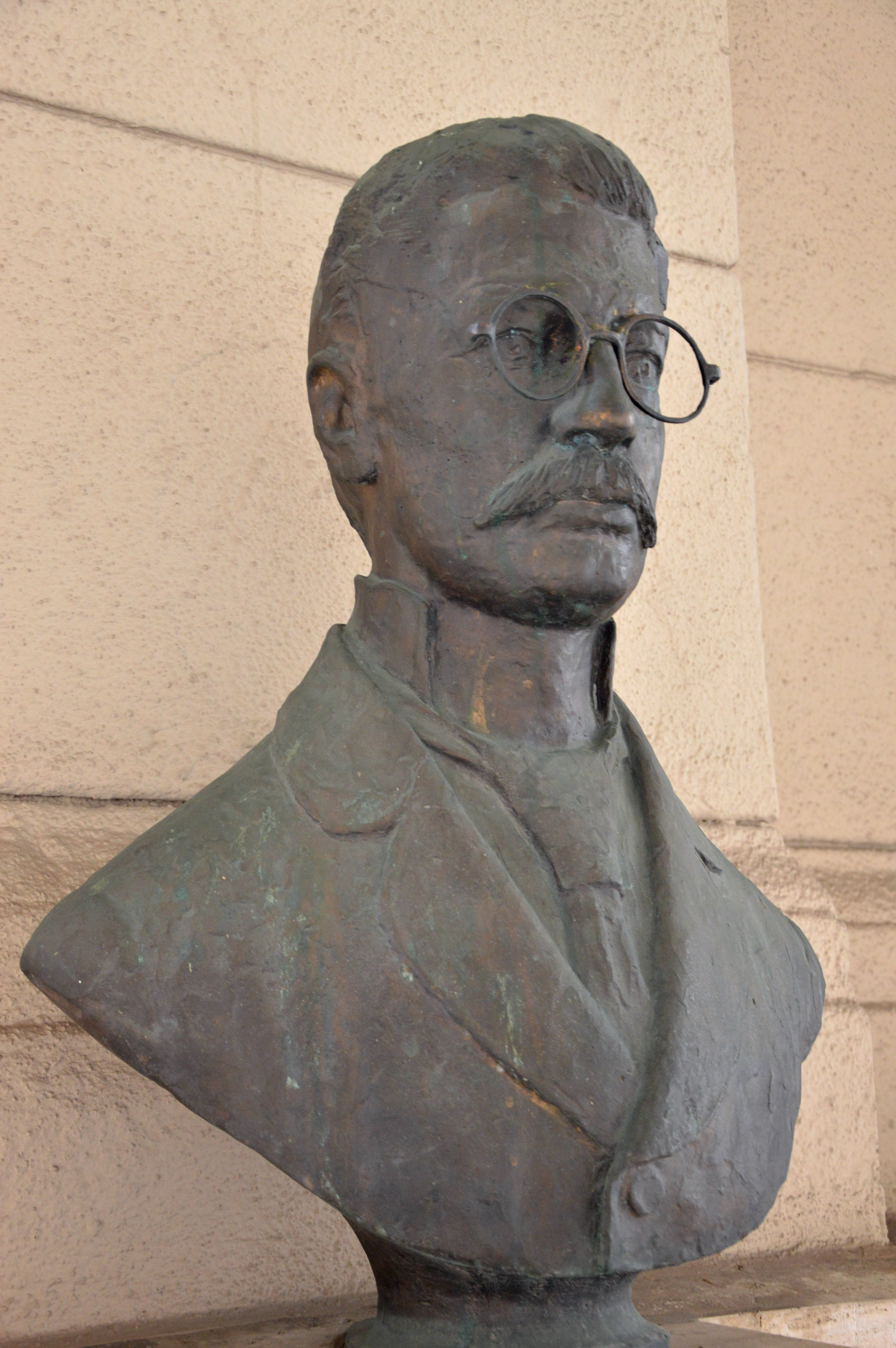
Bust of Jenő Kvassay Hungarian Ministry of Agriculture

Jenő Kvassay (Buda, 5 July 1850 – Budapest, 6 June 1919) was a civil engineer, specializing in hydraulic engineering. He was a significant figure in the development of the Hungarian water service.

== Education ==
After studying mechanical engineering at the Technical University of Pest, he attended the Hungarian Royal Economic Academy in Magyaróvár. He completed his education at the École des Ponts et Chaussées in Paris.

== Career ==
In 1876, Kvassay was the first to trace the saline pollution in the Great Hungarian Plain to the salt deposits (Lower Triassic evaporites) in the Austrian mountains. Although, later research also confirmed the hypothesis of József Szabó that weathering of peralkaline and alkaline rocks also contributed to this effect.

He went to work at the Hungarian Agricultural Ministry, and in 1879 founded and became the director of their "Civil Engineering Institute" (Kultúrmérnöki Szolgálat) which was primarily concerned with flood-prevention, irrigation and the development of agricultural water resources. This later became the "National Water Bureau" (Országos Vízügyi Főigazgatóság (OVF)). The current (2014-2020) national comprehensive water plan in Hungary is the "Jenő Kvassey Plan" (A Kvassay Jenő Terv).

== Awards ==
The Hungarian Academy of Sciences awarded him the Fáy Award for his work Mezőgazdasági vízműtan (Agricultural Water Works), and in 1918 they awarded Kvassay the Wahrman Prize for his work.
