= Mary Katona =

American politician (died 1982)

Member of the Connecticut House of Representatives from Fairfield
- In office 1959–1961 Serving with James E. Murray III
- Preceded by: Frederick Pope Jr. Mary P. James
- Succeeded by: Melvin Fennell; Erwin J. Cole

Personal details
- Born: 1921 or 1922
- Died: February 14, 1982 (aged 60) New Haven, Connecticut, U.S.
- Party: Democratic
- Education: St. Joseph's College (B.S.)

Mary Katona (1921 or 1922 – February 14, 1982) was an American politician who served in the Connecticut House of Representatives from 1959 to 1961, representing the town of Fairfield as a Democrat.

== Personal life ==
Katona was born in 1921 or 1922. Her father, George Katona, was a Hungarian immigrant, and Katona was raised on her parents' poultry farm in Bridgeport, Connecticut. She graduated from Roger Ludlowe High School and earned a bachelor's degree in biology from St. Joseph's College. Katona later did postgraduate research on biology at the University of Michigan and on education at Fairfield University.

== Career ==
Katona was elected to the Connecticut House of Representatives in 1958 and served one term representing the town of Fairfield as a Democrat. She served alongside fellow Democrat James E. Murray III. She served on the General Law Committee and the Public Health and Safety Committee.

Katona served as Fairfield's town clerk from 1961 to her death in 1982.

== Death ==
Katona died on February 14, 1982, at Saint Raphael Hospital in New Haven, Connecticut. She was 60.
