= Katona Twins =

Hungarian guitar duo

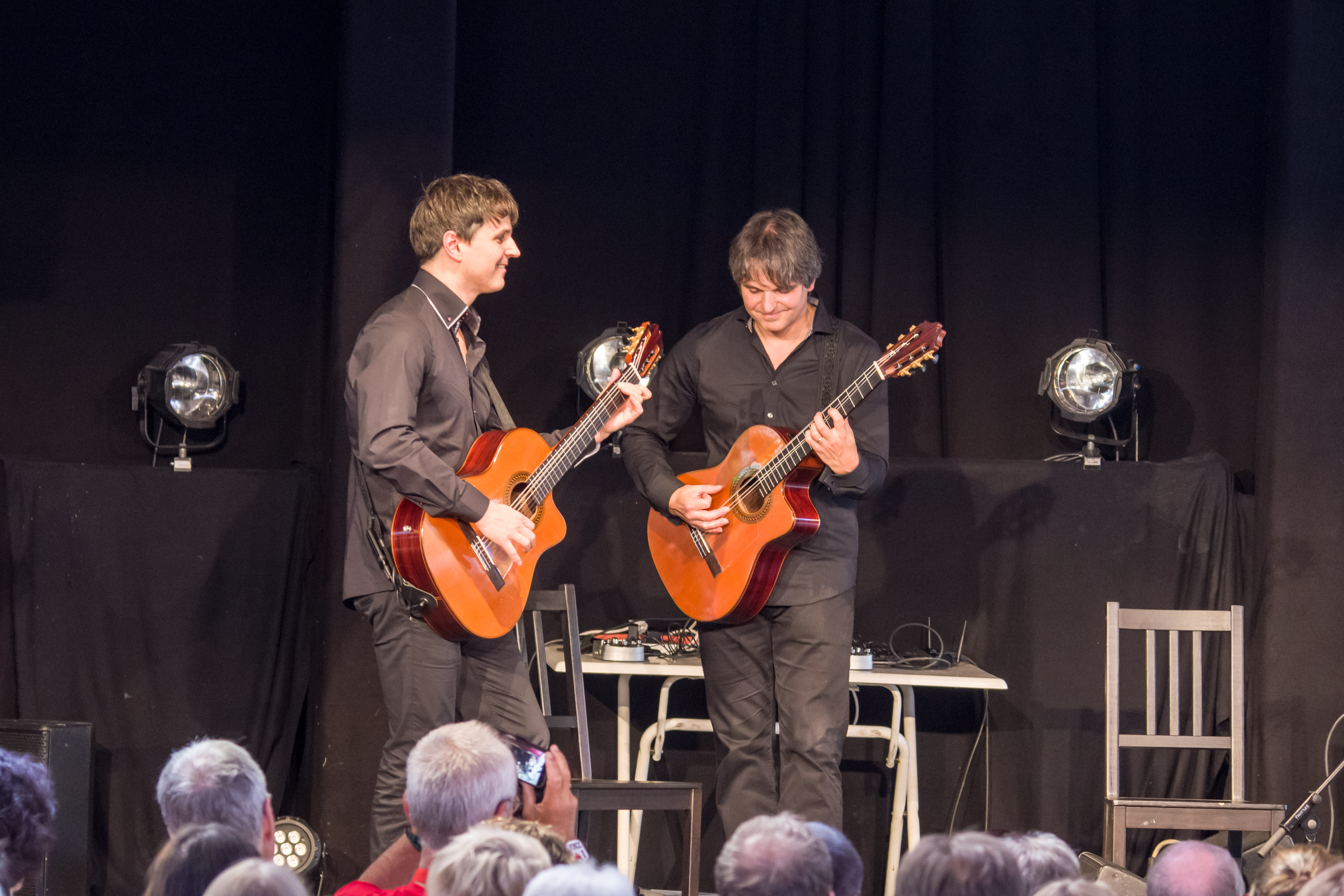
- Katona Twins 2017

Background information
- Origin: Budapest, Hungary
- Genres: Classical, Tango, Spanish guitar
- Instrument: Guitar
- Years active: c.1990 –
- Label: Channel Classics Records
- Members: Péter Katona; Zoltán Katona
- Website: katonatwins.com

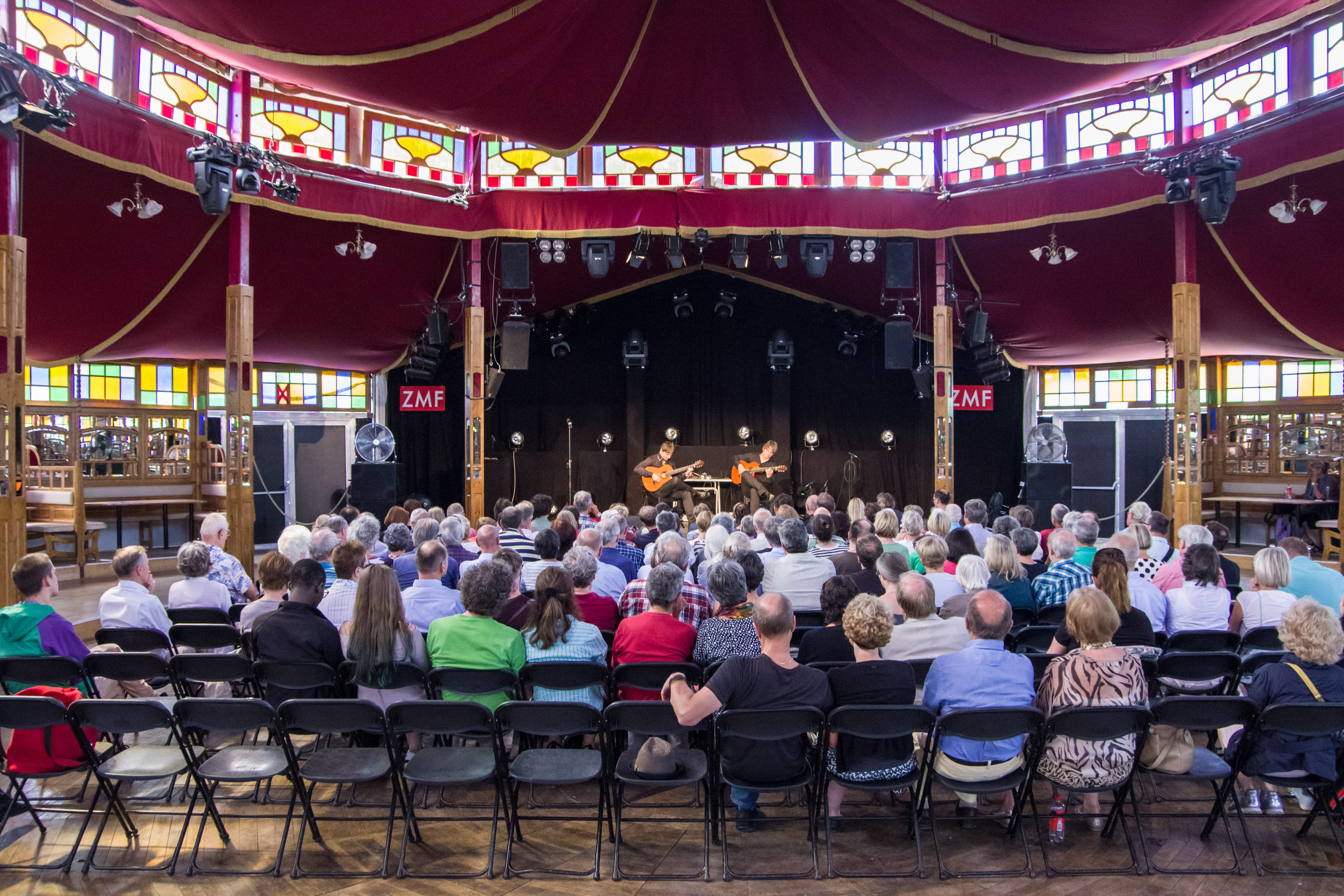
Katona Twins Zelt-Musik-Festival 2017 in Freiburg, (Germany)

The Katona Twins are a Hungarian guitar duo, composed of identical twins Péter and Zoltán Katona. They have performed at prestigious venues and at major music festivals around the world. Their performances and recordings have been widely reviewed by the music press and they have been described as "the classical world's best-known guitar duo".

The Katonas' repertoire includes Classical music, Tango and Spanish guitar. They have also adapted and arranged classical works for guitar duo. Their album releases have included works by Handel, Scarlatti, Isaac Albéniz and Ástor Piazzolla. They also perform works by de Falla and Castelnuovo-Tedesco, as well modern composers such as Paco de Lucía, and concerti for two guitars and orchestra by Rodrigo, Vivaldi and Bach.

== Biography ==
The identical twins Péter and Zoltán Katona were born in Budapest, Hungary in 1968.

From the age of ten they studied, both individually and as a guitar duo, at the Béla Bartók Conservatory in Budapest with Ede Roth, the Academy of Music in Kassel with Wolfgang Lendle, and the Hochschule für Musik, Theater und Tanz (Frankfurt University of Music and Performing Arts), in Frankfurt-am-Main with Michael Teuchert, Germany. They also studied under Michael Lewin at the Royal Academy of Music in London.

They made their Carnegie Hall debut in 1998. The Katona Twins have toured widely, playing in Ireland; they have played at the Royal Festival Hall and Wigmore Hall in London, and at the Cheltenham International Music Festival in 2004, with the London Sinfonietta. Michael Berkeley composed a double concerto for performance by the twins there. Their concert schedule for 2007 included venues in Japan, France, Germany, and the United States.

== Awards ==
- First Prize, "Concours International de Guitarre en Duo", Montélimar, France (1993)
- First Prize, "International Music Competition for Guitar Duos", Bubenreuth, Germany (1993)
- Cultural Prize of the City of Kassel, Germany (1993)
- S. T. Johnson Foundation prize (1995)
- The Laura Ashley prize (1996)
- Young Concert Artist Trust auditions in London (1997)
- Concert Artists Guild Competition, New York (1998)
- Borletti-Buitoni prize (2004), the trust's first ever award to guitarists.

== Other ==
The Katona twins served as jury members for the 2nd International Guitar Festival Heinsberg 2007

== Discography ==
- Isaac Albéniz, España, Iberia, Mallorca, (1997), Channel Classics CCS 10397 1
- Joaquín Rodrigo, Concierto Madrigal; Tonadillas, (1998), Channel Classics CCS 16698 1 Reviews: Musicweb, Editor's Choice, Gramophone, Feb 2002
- Sonatas – Scarlatti & Handel, (1998), Channel Classics CCS 14298 Reviews: The Flying Inkpot
- Ástor Piazzolla, Le Grand Tango, (2004), Channel Classics CCS 19804 Reviews: Classics Today, Audiophile Audition, Oakland Tribune Klassik.com(in German)
- Piazzolla, Mozart, Granados, de Falla
- J.S. Bach, (2013) Channel Classics CCS SA 34713
