= Cătina, Cluj =

Cătina
- Commune
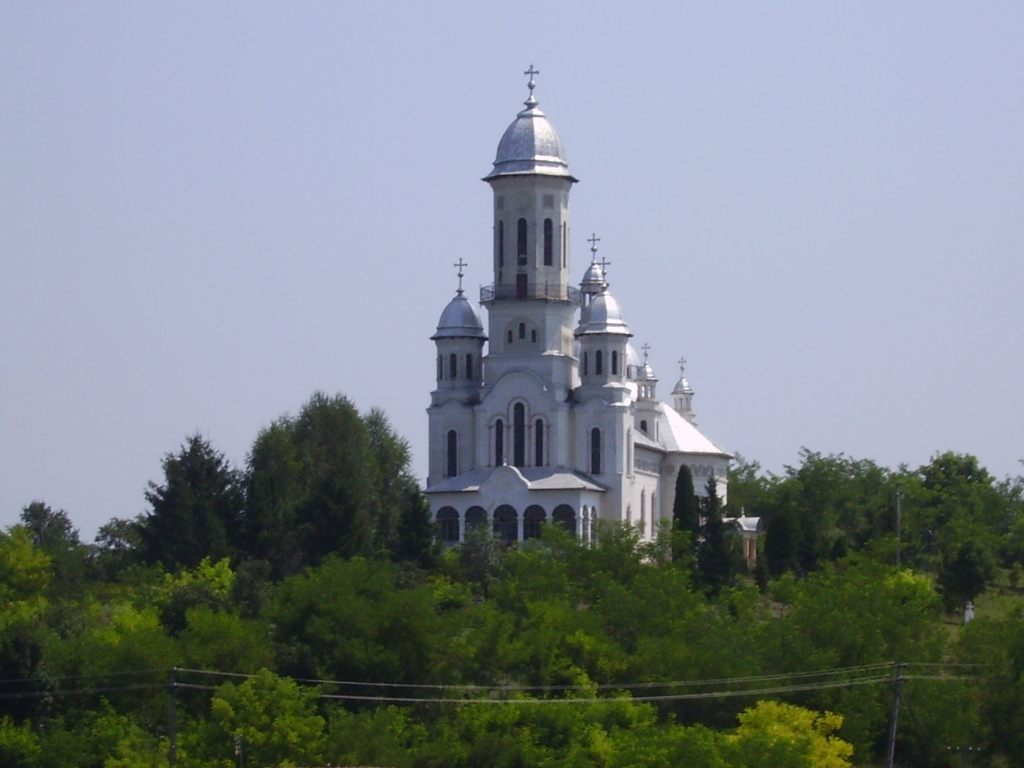
- Cătina Orthodox Church

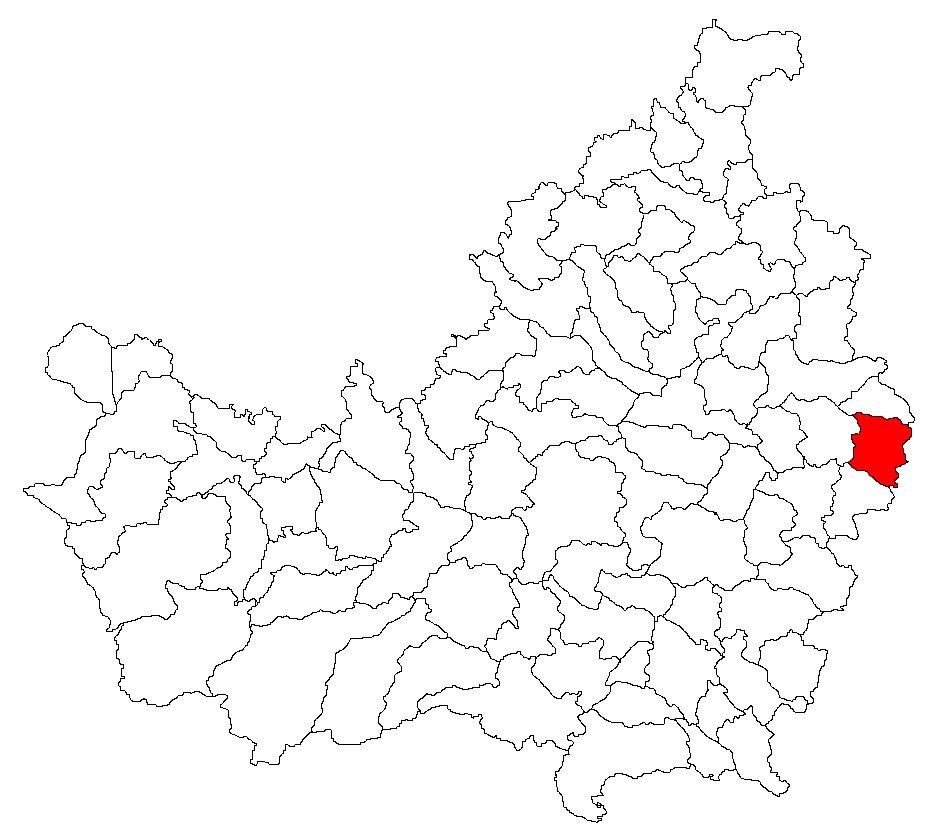
- Location in Cluj County

- Location in Romania
- Coordinates: 46°50′40″N 24°09′50″E
- Country: Romania
- County: Cluj
- Established: 1327
- Subdivisions: Cătina, Copru, Feldioara, Hagău, Hodaie, Valea Caldă

Government
  - Mayor (2024–2028): Florin-Călin Borbely (PMP)
- Area: 52.77 km^{2} (20.37 sq mi)
- Elevation: 322 m (1,056 ft)
- Population (2021-12-01): 1,567
  - Density: 29.69/km^{2} (76.91/sq mi)
- Time zone: UTC+02:00 (EET)
  - Summer (DST): UTC+03:00 (EEST)
- Postal code: 407170
- Area code: +(40) x64
- Vehicle reg.: CJ
- Website: primariacatina.ro

Cătina (Hungarian: Katona; German: Kettin) is a commune in Cluj County, Transylvania, Romania. It is composed of six villages: Cătina, Copru (Kapor), Feldioara (Melegföldvár), Hagău (Hágótanya), Hodaie, and Valea Caldă (Melegvölgyitanya).

== Demographics ==
According to the 2002 census, the commune had 2,203 inhabitants; Romanians made up 75.71% of the population, Hungarians made up 20.83%, and Roma made up 3.40%. At the 2021 census, Cătina had a population of 1,567; of those, 74.92% were Romanians, 16.27% Hungarians, and 4.4% Roma.

== Natives ==
- Jenő Barcsay (1900–1988), painter
