= Bijin =

Japanese term for a beautiful woman

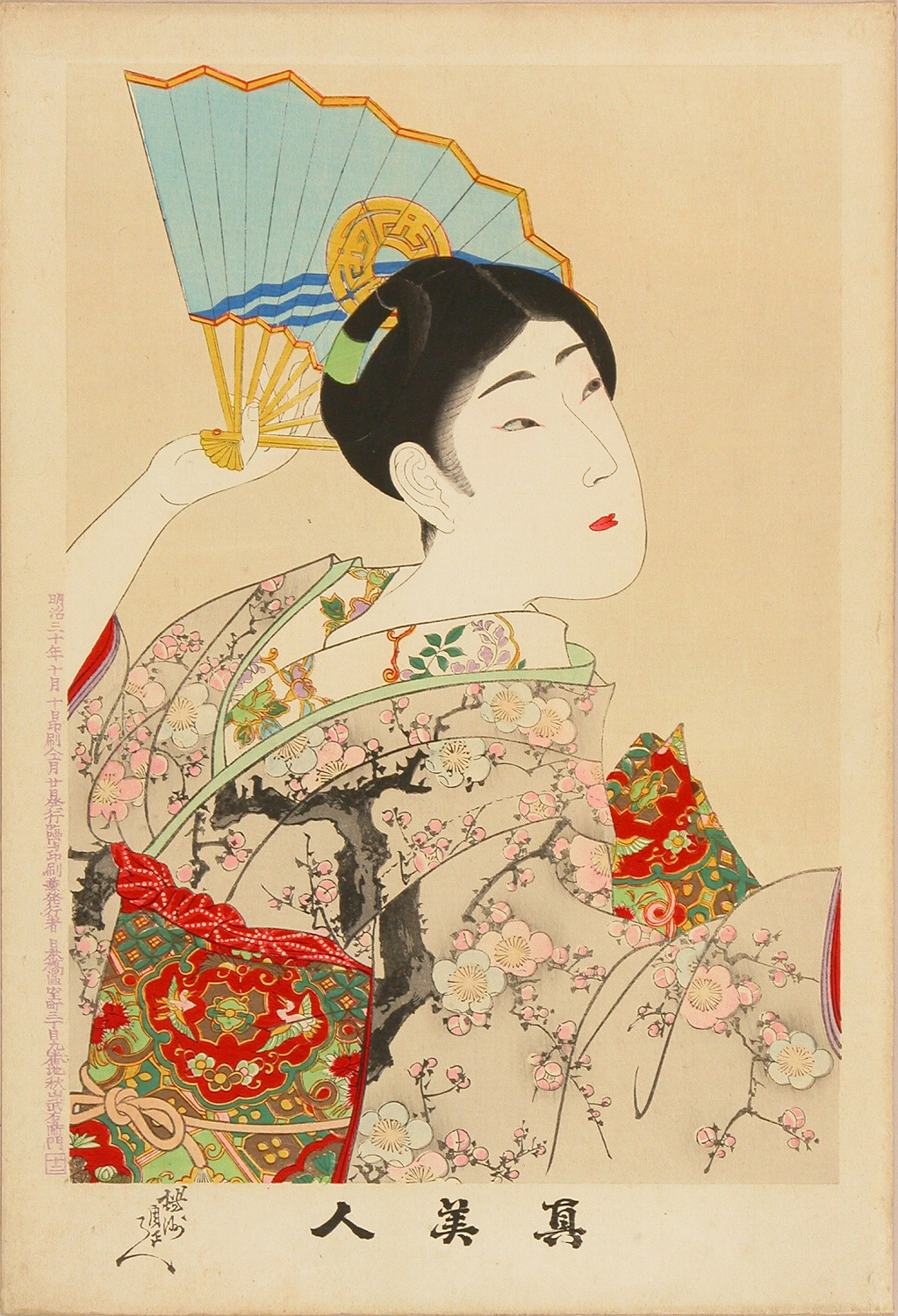
Shin Bijin (1897) by Yōshū Chikanobu

Bijin (美人) is a Japanese term which literally means "a beautiful person" and is synonymous with bijo (美女, "beautiful woman"). Girls are usually called bishōjo (美少女), while men are known as bidanshi (美男子) and boys are bishōnen (美少年). The term originally derives from the Middle Chinese word mijX nyin (美人; modern Standard Chinese měirén), and the word 美人 is used widely in several Asian countries including China, South Korea, North Korea, Taiwan and Vietnam.

== Meaning ==
In practice the term "bijin" means "beautiful woman" because the first kanji character, bi (美), has a feminine connotation. The character expressed the concept of beauty by first using the element for "sheep", which must have been viewed as beautiful, and was combined with the element for "big", ultimately forming a new kanji. Bijin can also be translated as "a beauty". Its modern meaning was also said to have undergone an internationalization, with the term for the moon and then a lord or ruler on high. People who are called a bijin are usually considered beautiful, charming and harmonious women who wear pretty clothes.

In Mandarin Chinese, 美人 (Pinyin: měirén) also means "a beautiful woman". Like Mandarin Chinese, in Korean, 美人 (Korean: 미인; RR: Miin) means "a beautiful woman", and in Vietnamese, 美人 (mĩ nhân) also means "beautiful woman". The Min Nan pronunciation, bí-jîn, meaning the same as its Mandarin equivalent, is especially similar to the Japanese.

== Beautiful image in Japan ==
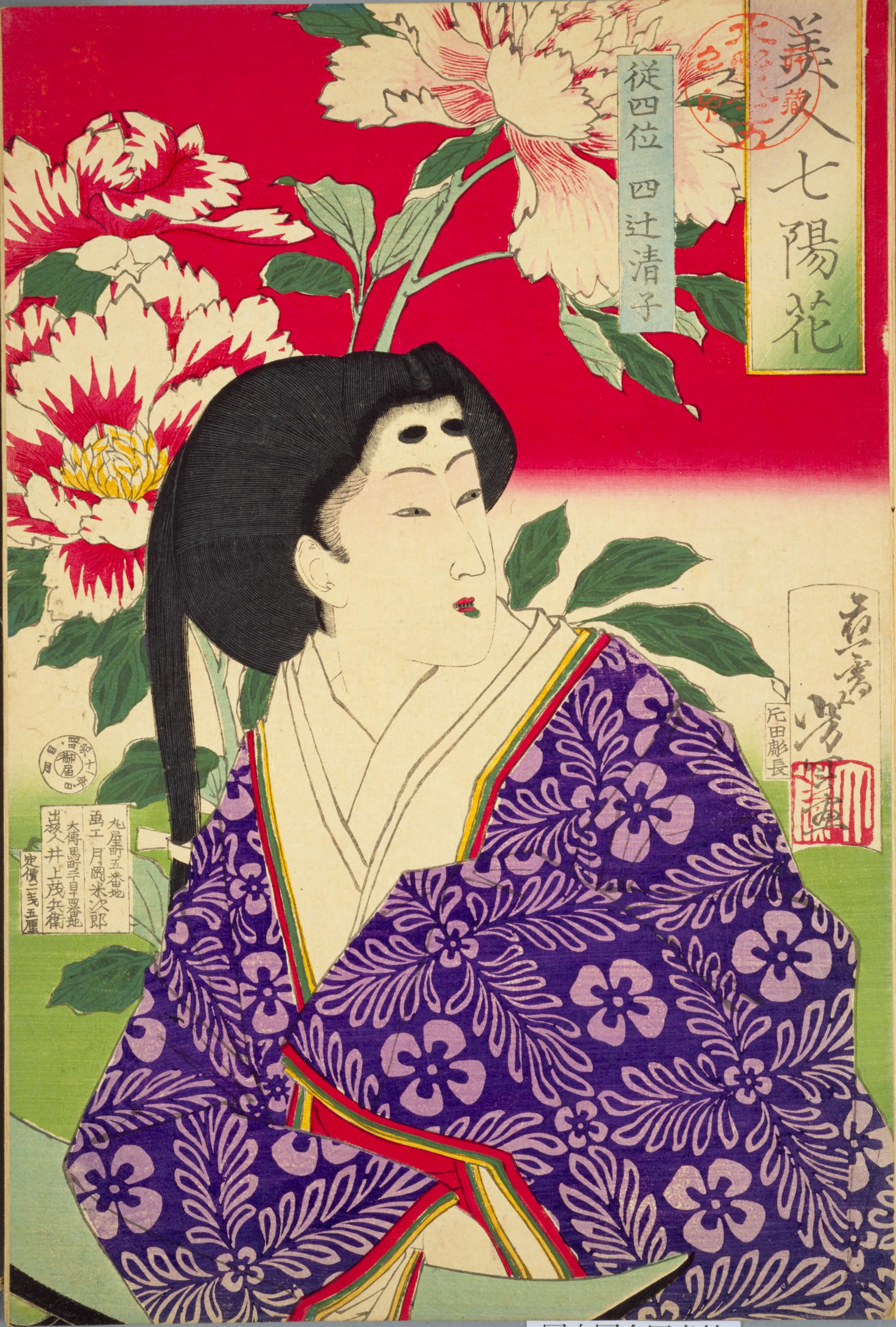
Bijin Shichi Yōka (1878) by Yoshitoshi

During the Heian period in Japan, fine-textured fair skin, plump cheeks, and long, supple black hair were revered as typical beauty conditions. However, since it was decided that a woman with a certain status or higher would not show her face to a man other than her close relatives, the man would sneak into the sleeping place of the woman he was looking for and see it for the first time under a dim light. Makeup involved applying white powder to the face, removing the eyebrows, drawing with ink (引き眉 hikimayu), and dyeing the teeth black (お歯黒 ohaguro), emphasizing bewitching rather than healthy beauty. The adult age of women at that time was 12 to 14 years old, which was the beginning of the tide, and the 30s were considered to have already passed the peak age. "Hikime kagibana" is the name of the expression technique used when drawing a noble person in Heian paintings, such as scenes taken from The Tale of Genji.

Westerner Luís Fróis, who stayed in Japan for more than 30 years during the Warring States period, said, "Europeans say big eyes are beautiful. The Japanese consider it horrifying and make it beautiful to have the eyes closed." This describes how the Japanese at that time idealized the smaller eyes as depicted in picture scrolls and bijin-ga rather than big eyes.

From the Edo period onwards, beauty standards in Japan came to idealise light skin, delicate features, a small mouth, a high forehead, small eyes and rich black hair, as depicted in many ukiyo-e pictures. In the best-selling makeup instruction book "Miyako Customs Makeup Den" at that time, there was a section called "Den to see the greatness of the eyes", which shows that the eyes had a different aesthetic sense from the present. Saikaku Ihara's "Five Women Who Loved Love" has a description that he makes an unreasonable wish at a shrine to raise his low nose, suggesting that he preferred the height of his nose at that time. This sense of beauty became the basis of the image of beautiful women from the Meiji era to the Taisho era.

== In Japanese art ==
Pictures of bijin in Japanese art are called bijin-ga. Bijin-ga is described as a genre of ukiyo-e paintings. Some of the greatest bijinga artists are Utamaro, Suzuki Harunobu and Torii Kiyonaga. Until the beginning of the 20th century, bijin-ga were very popular.

== Famous bijin ==
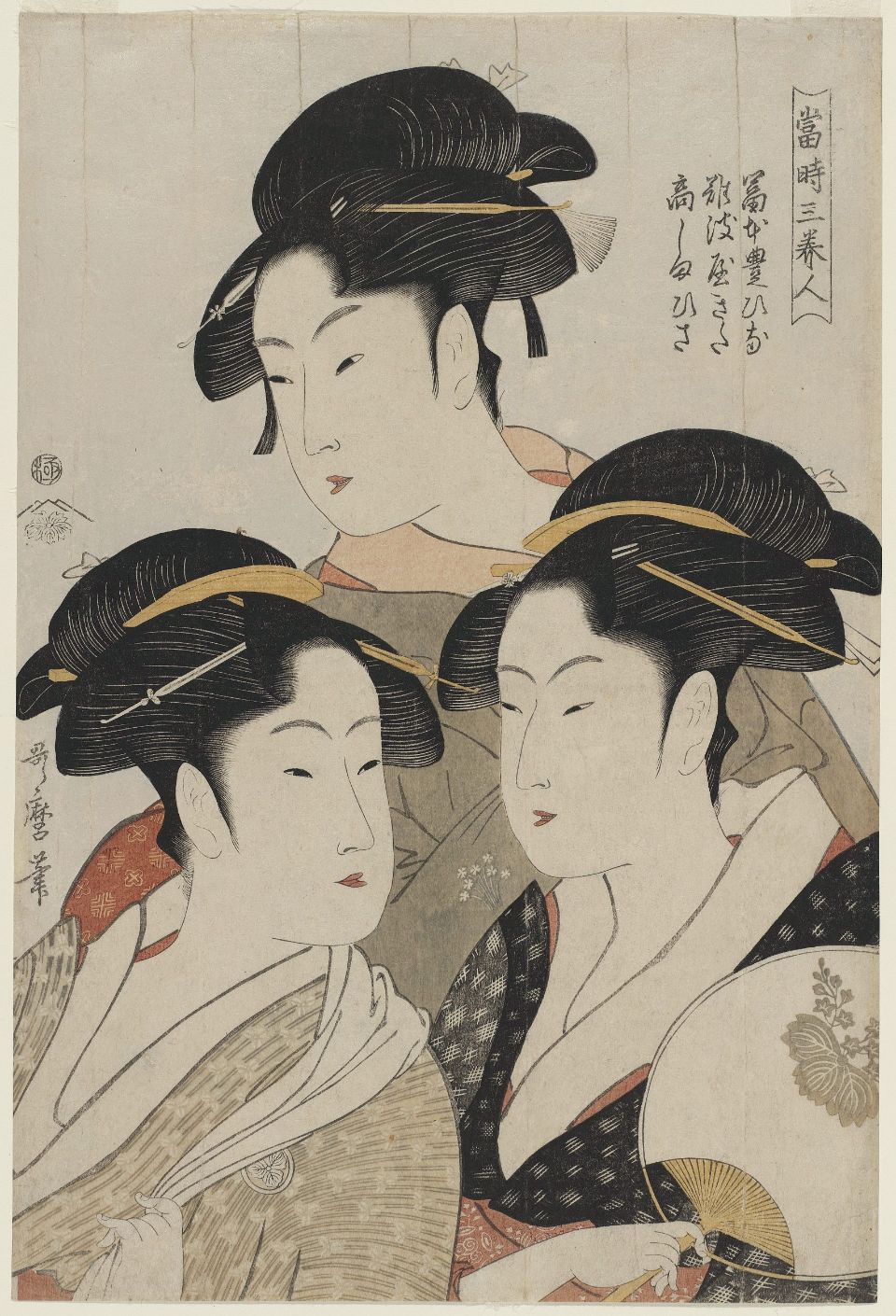
Three Beauties of the Present Time (1793) by Utamaro

=== Nihon Sandai Bijin (The Three Beauties of Japan) ===
Nihon Sandai Bijin (The Three Beauties of Japan) is a term referring to several three women that were considered the most beautiful in Japan.

- Three Beauties of Taishō period:
  - Takeko Kujō
  - Byakuren Yanagiwara
  - Egi Kinkin
  - Hayashi Kimuko
- Three Beauties of the Present Day:
  - Tomimoto Toyohina
  - Naniwaya Okita
  - Takashima Ohisa
- Three Beauties of Japan:
  - Fujiwara no Michitsuna's mother
  - Soto-ori-hime
  - Ono no Komachi

=== Akita bijin ===
Akita, in northern Japan, is famous for the "bijin of Akita" who are characterized by their round face, clear skin and high-pitched voice. Ono no Komachi, one of the Thirty-six Immortals of Poetry, was a bijin from Akita.

=== Utamaro's bijin ===
Some of Utamaro's favourite models have remained famous as bijin; for example Naniwaya Okita (fr), a courtesan Hanaōgi (fr), Tomimoto Toyohina (fr) and Takashima Ohisa.

== Gallery ==
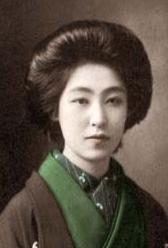
Hayashi Kimuko, one of the Three Beauties of Taishō period

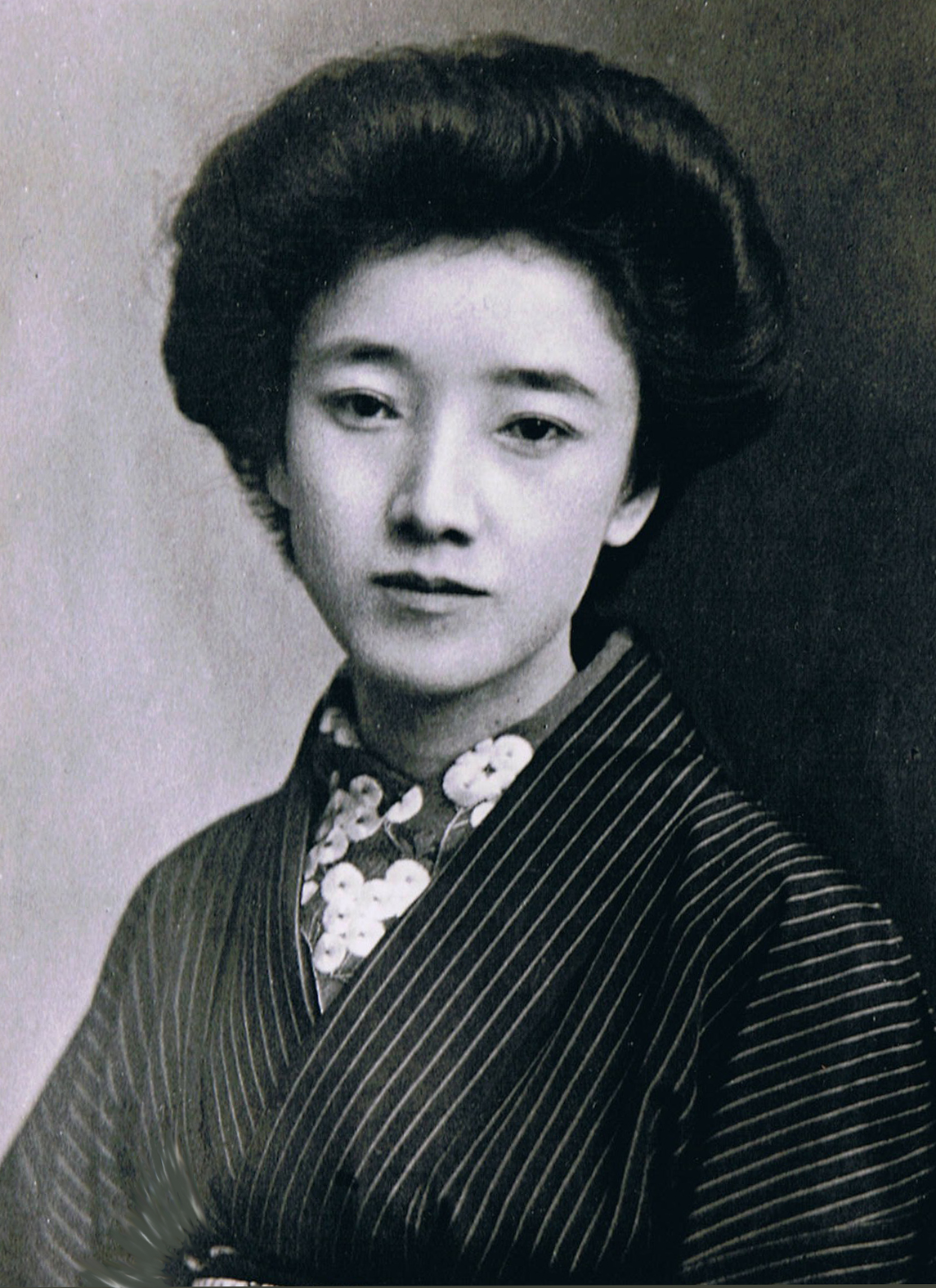
Byakuren Yanagiwara, one of the Three Beauties of Taishō period

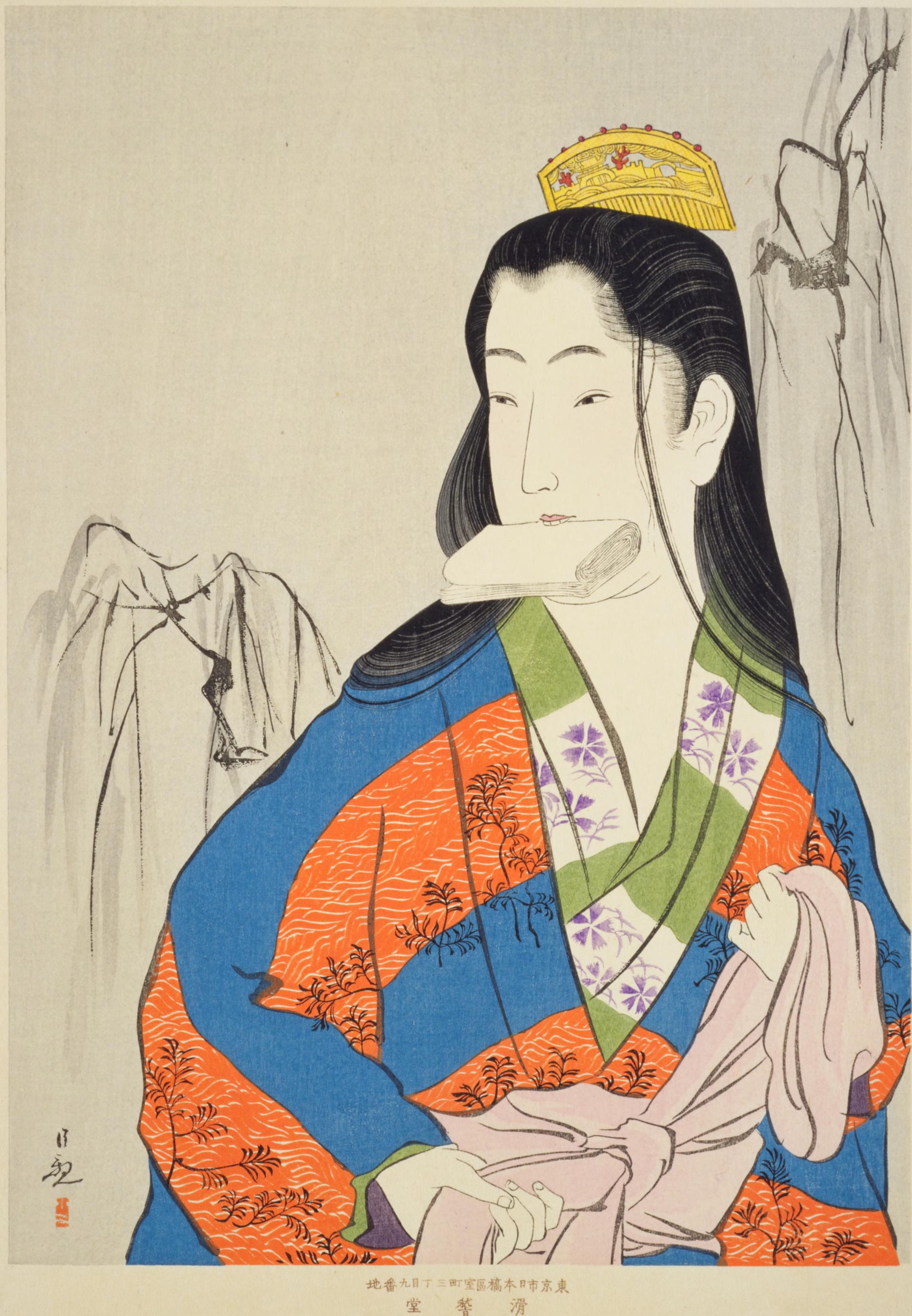
Bijin-zu by Kobayashi Kiyochika (1847–1915)

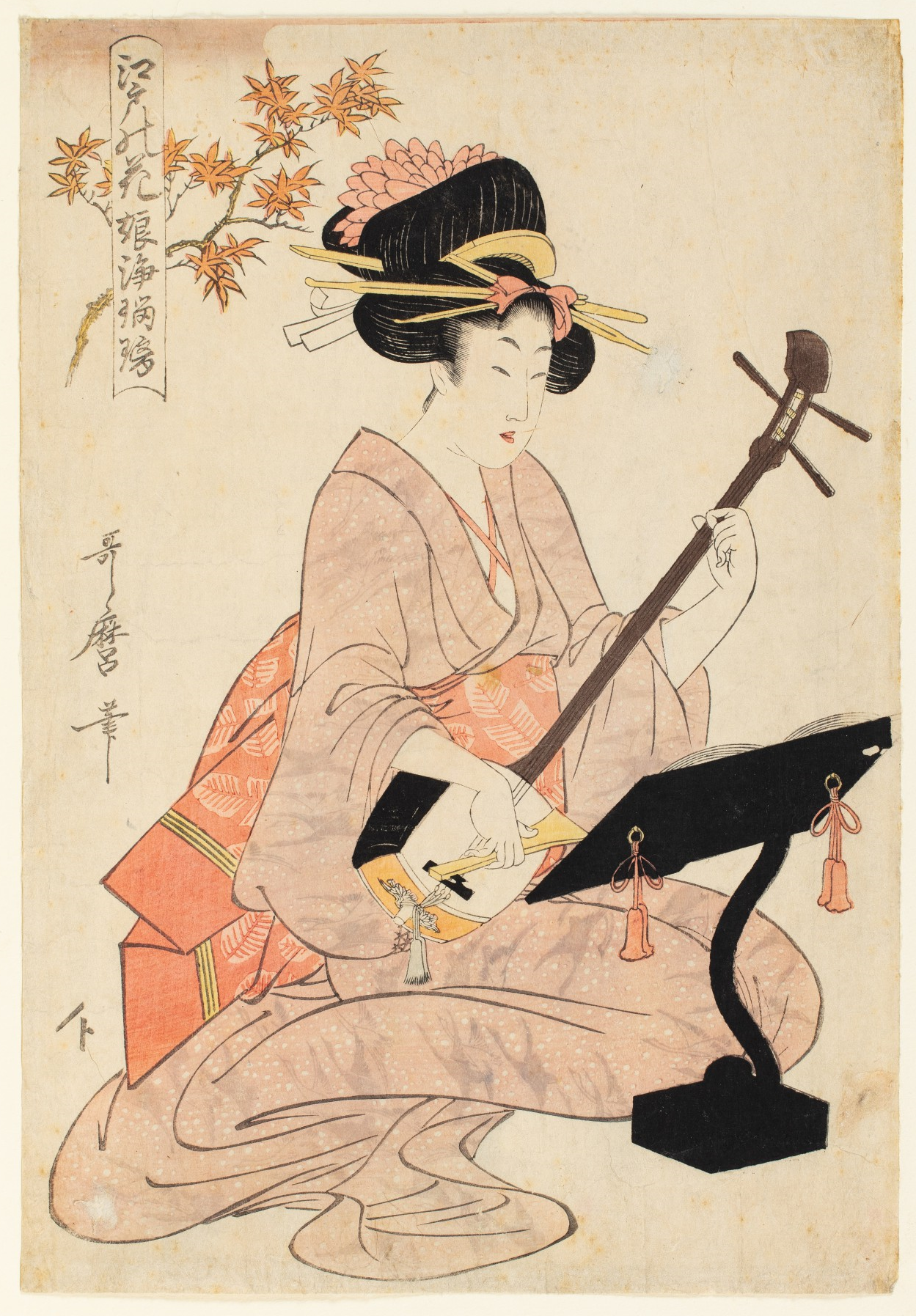
Bijin-ga by Kitagawa Utamaro ("Flowers of Edo: Young Woman's Narrative Chanting to the Samisen", c. 1803)

== See also ==
- Bijin-ga
- Bihaku
- Bishōjo
- Bishōnen
