= Oshiroi =

Traditional white foundation used in Japan

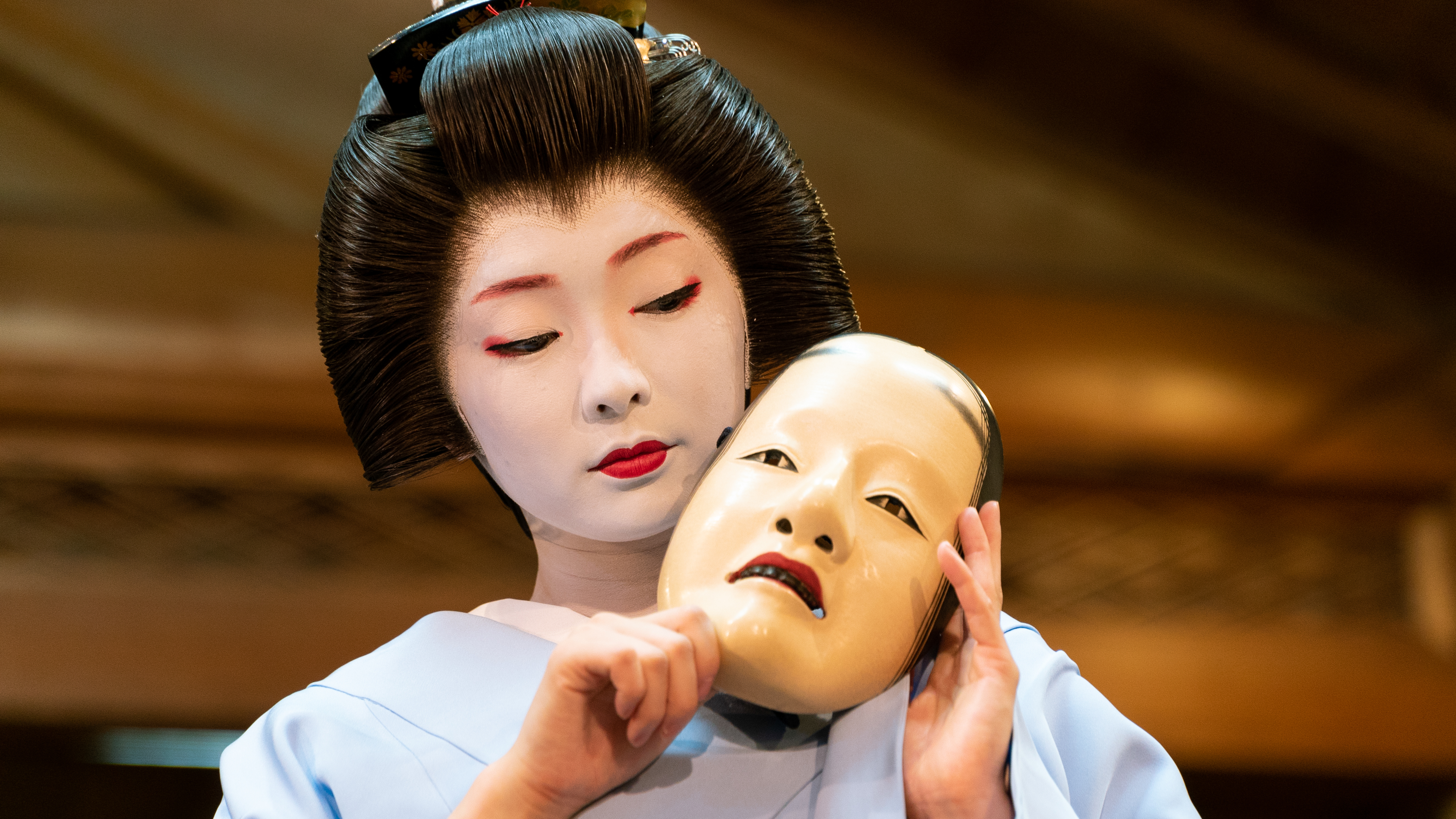
Kyoto geisha Toshimana holding a Nōh mask, wearing full make-up and a katsura (wig)

Oshiroi (白粉) is a powder foundation traditionally used by kabuki actors, geisha, and their apprentices. The word is written with kanji meaning "white powder", and is pronounced as the word for white (shiroi) with the honorific prefix o-.

When worn by geisha and maiko, oshiroi is notable for only partially covering the nape of the neck, as an uncovered nape was traditionally considered erotic in Japanese culture.

== Description ==
Oshiroi is traditionally applied over a base of two types of wax used as a primer: ishineri (石練) is applied to the eyebrows, whereas bintsuke (facial wax) is applied to cover the rest of the face and the neck. The upper portion of back is also covered if the wearer will be dressed in a susohiki ("trailing skirt") kimono, where the upper half of the neck will be visible.

The oshiroi is mixed with water before being applied with a wide, flat brush over the neck, face and back. The oshiroi must be mixed carefully with water to achieve the right consistency, and can be difficult to achieve, as oshiroi that has too much moisture will not apply smoothly to the face, and oshiroi that has too little will crack and potentially fall off when worn.

Oshiroi is painted straight over the eyebrows, with the ishineri providing a smooth surface over the eyebrows to be painted over. The face is then powdered with rice powder, before the details around the eyes, eyebrows and mouth are drawn in.

== Application ==
=== Geisha and maiko ===
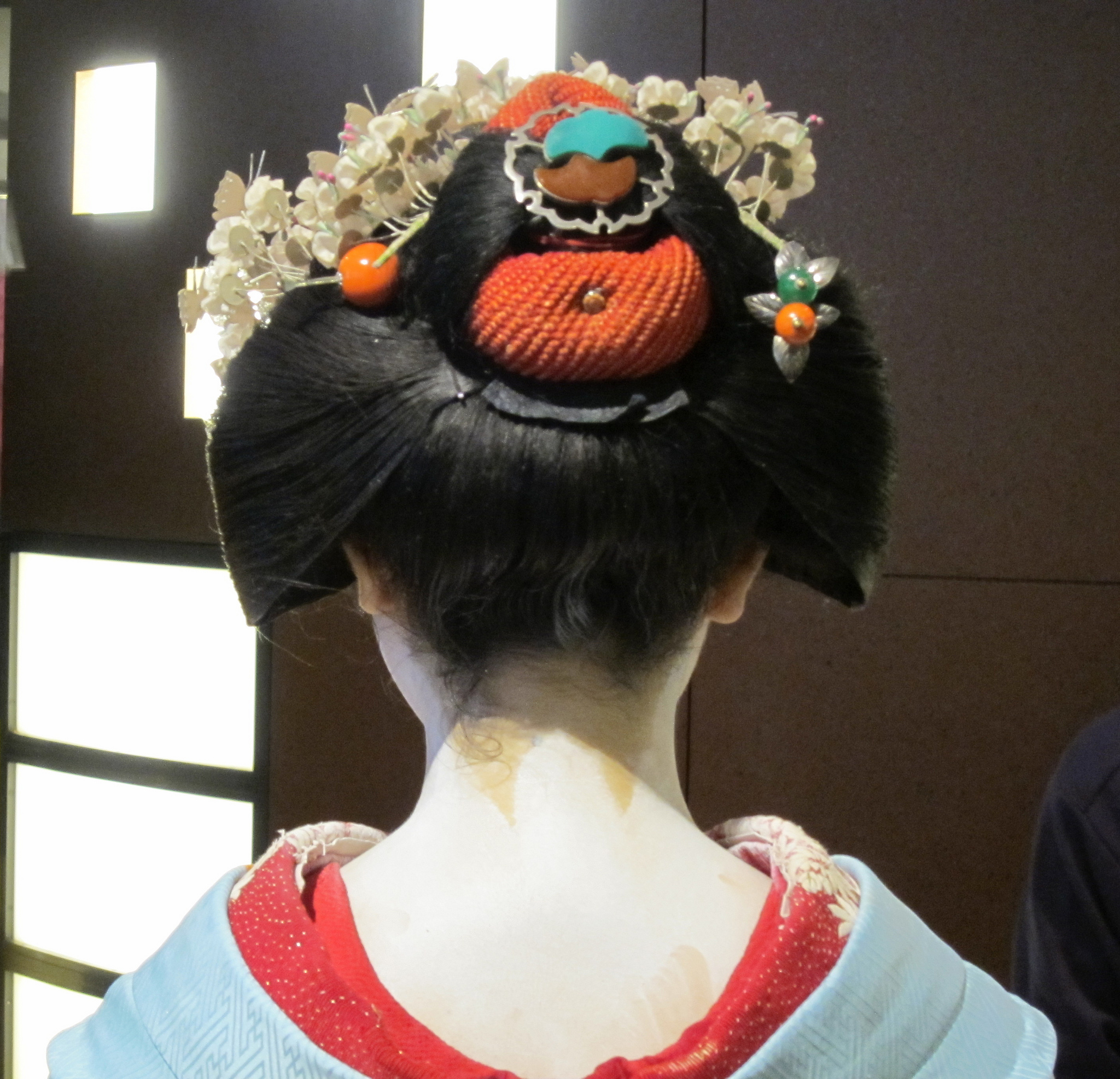
Maiko Katsune wearing oshiroi in the eri-ashi style

For both geisha and maiko, application of oshiroi varies by occasion, use, and sometimes region.

Both geisha and maiko wear oshiroi on the face and neck, but application on the back of the neck differs per occasion. For most situations, a pattern known as eri-ashi (襟足, lit. 'nape legs') is worn, forming two triangular stripes of unpainted skin from the nape of the neck downward. For formal occasions, a three-stripe pattern known as sanbon-ashi (三本足, lit. 'triple legs') is used.

Eri-ashi can be painted freehand with a smaller brush, but sanbon-ashi are generally painted using a stencil. Both geisha and maiko, whilst aiming for a white-faced appearance, do not use a heavy application of oshiroi unless worn for special performances, instead blending the foundation into the skin with the use of a blusher, known as tonoko.

For geisha and maiko, application of oshiroi varies depending on age, status and region. Since the application of oshiroi can prove challenging, a younger maiko may have her okā-san ("mother" – typically the mother of the geisha house) or her "older sister" geisha mentor apply it for her at first.

Younger apprentices may, in some regions, wear only oshiroi and blusher at the beginning of their apprenticeship to mark their inexperience, with the addition of black and red eyeliner at a later stage. Likewise, senior geisha tend not to wear any blusher, and wear oshiroi on fewer occasions over time, eventually wearing it only for special occasions and stage performances.

The style of how a maiko wears oshiroi may also vary depending on the region of Japan an apprentice works in; in some districts, apprentices may only wear a light application of oshiroi, whereas in others, a heavier application is more common. Makeup styles may also vary in their use of blusher, red eyeliner and black eyeliner; this typically depends on both the inclinations of the mother of the house, and the general style of the geisha district.

=== Kabuki ===
In contrast to geisha and maiko, kabuki actors apply their oshiroi thickly, creating a bright white face visible from the furthest seats in the audience. A kabuki actor doing a quick change between characters may simply paint over their previous makeup, as oshiroi is opaque enough that previous makeup will not be visible.

== History ==
Oshiroi was used as base makeup before foundation was adopted in Japan. However, once foundation became commonplace, some began to use it over foundation as a loose powder or as a pressed powder for touch-ups.

In the past, the type of oshiroi used contained white lead, and would eventually give the wearer lead poisoning. The use of white lead in makeup was outlawed in Japan in 1934.

== See also ==
- Bijin
- Bijin-ga
