= Ohaguro =

Old Japanese custom of teeth blackening

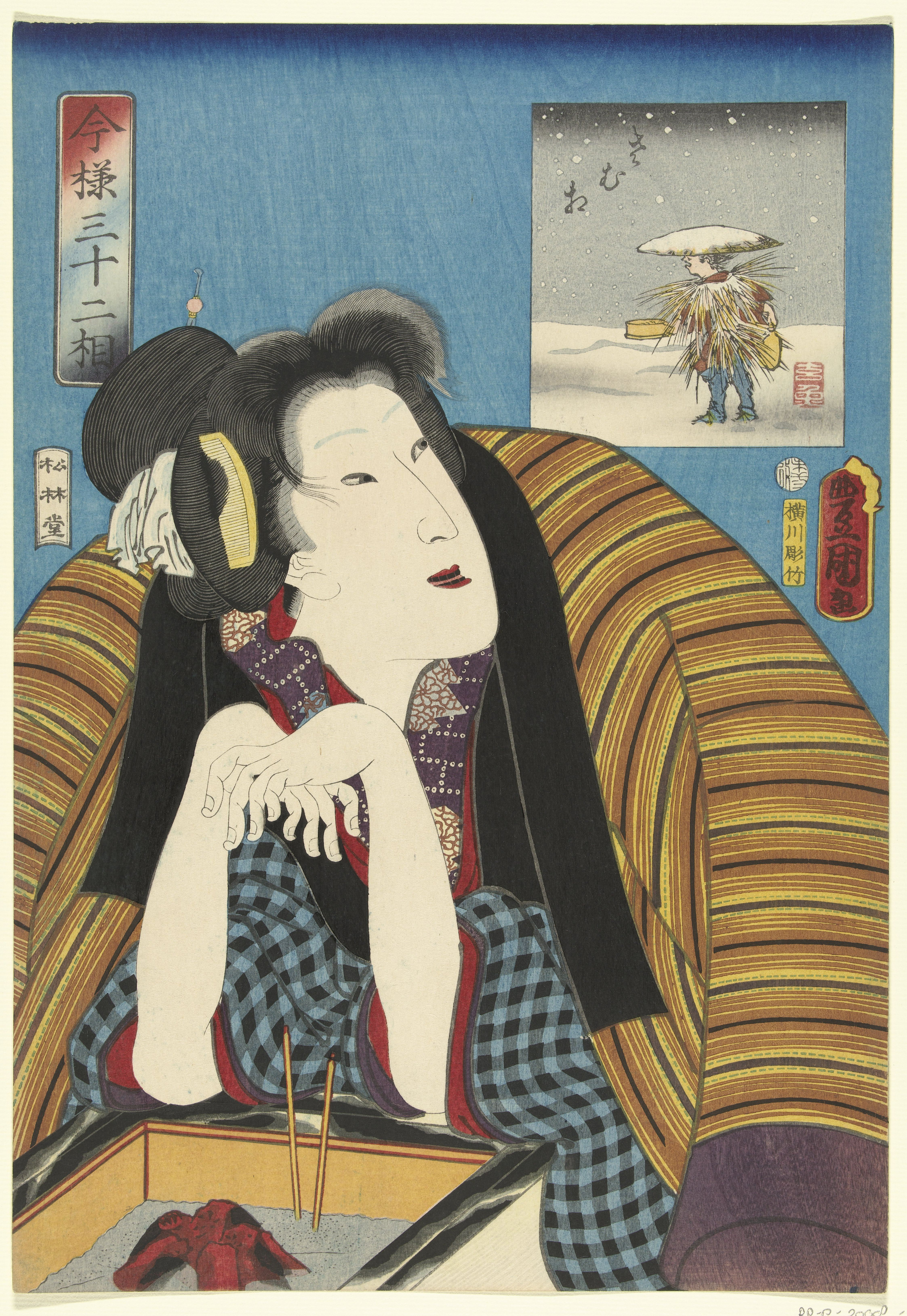
Teeth blackening. Nishiki-e by Utagawa Kunisada, 1820, from the series Mirrors of the modern boudoir.

Ohaguro (Japanese: お歯黒; pronounced [ohaɡɯɾo], lit. 'black teeth') is the name given in Japan to the custom of blackening one's teeth with a solution of iron filings and vinegar. It was especially popular between the Heian and Edo periods, from the 10th century until the late 19th century, but the opening of the country to Western customs during the Meiji period led to its gradual disappearance. It was a tradition practiced mainly by married women and some men, almost always members of the aristocracy and samurai. In addition to Japanese society's preference for black teeth, it was also considered beneficial to health, as it prevented tooth decay by acting as a dental sealant. The practice of dyeing one's teeth black was also a known and widespread practice in southeastern China and Southeast Asia, although with different recipes.

== Etymology ==
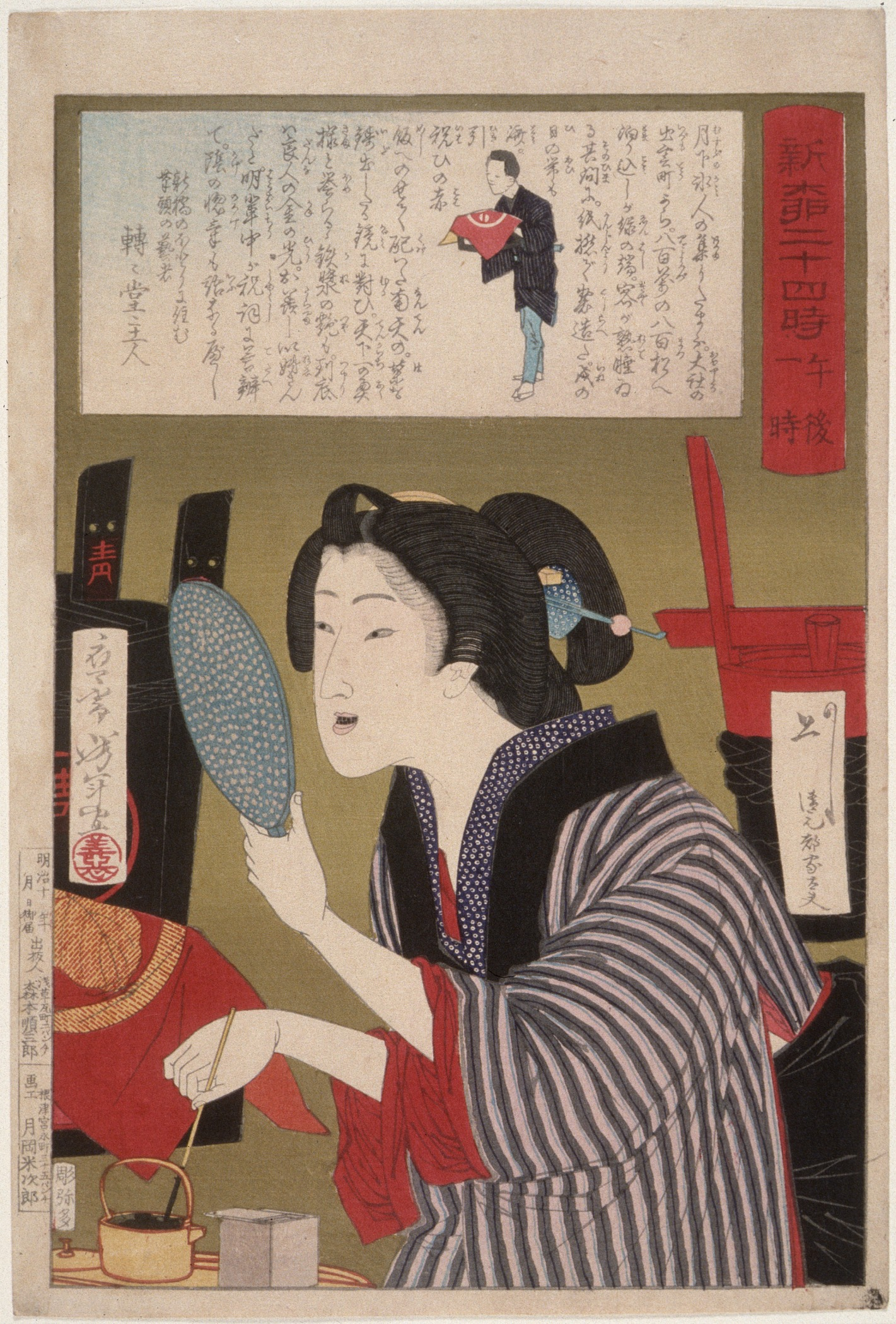
Geisha blackening her teeth at 1:00 p.m.. Ukiyo-e by Tsukioka Yoshitoshi, number 13 in the series 24 hours in Shinbashi and Yanagibashi.

The word ohaguro is composed of the honorific prefix o- (お), the term ha (歯, 'tooth'), and the term kuro (黒, 'black'). Due to a phonological process called rendaku, the "k" in kuro voices to become a "g" sound, and the compound term is pronounced ohaguro, not *ohakuro.

The term ohaguro arose among upper-class women in the early Edo period as part of nyōbō kotoba or "women's language", as a shift from the much-older term hagurome (歯黒め, 'tooth blackening'). Ohaguro is normally spelled お歯黒, but there is an alternative spelling 鉄漿 where the kanji literally mean "iron juice", alluding to the liquid used in the process. This alternative spelling also has a separate pronunciation, tesshō. Synonyms include fushimizu (五倍子水, 'nutgall water'; so called for the tannins extracted from the galls for use in this mixture), kanetsuke (鉄漿付け, literally 'metal + putting on'), tsukegane (つけがね, literally 'putting on + metal'), and hagurome (歯黒め, 'tooth blackening').

== Origin and meaning ==
Ohaguro existed in Japan in one form or another for hundreds of years, and was considered a symbol of beauty for much of this time. Objects with a deep black color, such as those lacquered to a glossy black, were considered to be of great beauty, and many shades of black were used in dyeing kimono, with different shades holding different meanings.

The reasons for the invention of ohaguro are still unclear: simple dental care has been proposed, as well as the differentiation between humans and demons depicted with large white fangs, just as in other Southeast Asian cultures; the fact that teeth are the only visible part of the skeleton, which links them to death and makes them taboo; or the Japanese and other Far Eastern cultures holding a preference for concealing the public display of feelings with the combination of oshiroi (white makeup), the complete plucking of the eyebrows, and their repainting – a practice known as hikimayu (引眉, hikimayu) – and the dyeing of teeth creating a masklike appearance. The current Japanese female custom of covering the mouth when smiling derives to a greater or lesser degree from this consideration and from the preference until the 19th century for black-toothed rather than white mouths.

Among the samurai, its origin is associated with the idea of loyalty expressed by the color black. (Note: Freeman-Mitford mentions a supposed origin of male use in which a sadaijin of the 12th century began to make up in the manner of women because of his desire to appear more feminine. Eventually it would have spread through the court and from there to the followers of the Hōjō clan, whose leaders were the shikken of the Kamakura shogunate, as a sign of loyalty.) When a samurai dyed his teeth black, it reflected his decision not to serve another lord for the rest of his life, and, from the time of the shikken or regents of the shōgun, the nobles applied it with similar regard for loyalty.

=== History ===
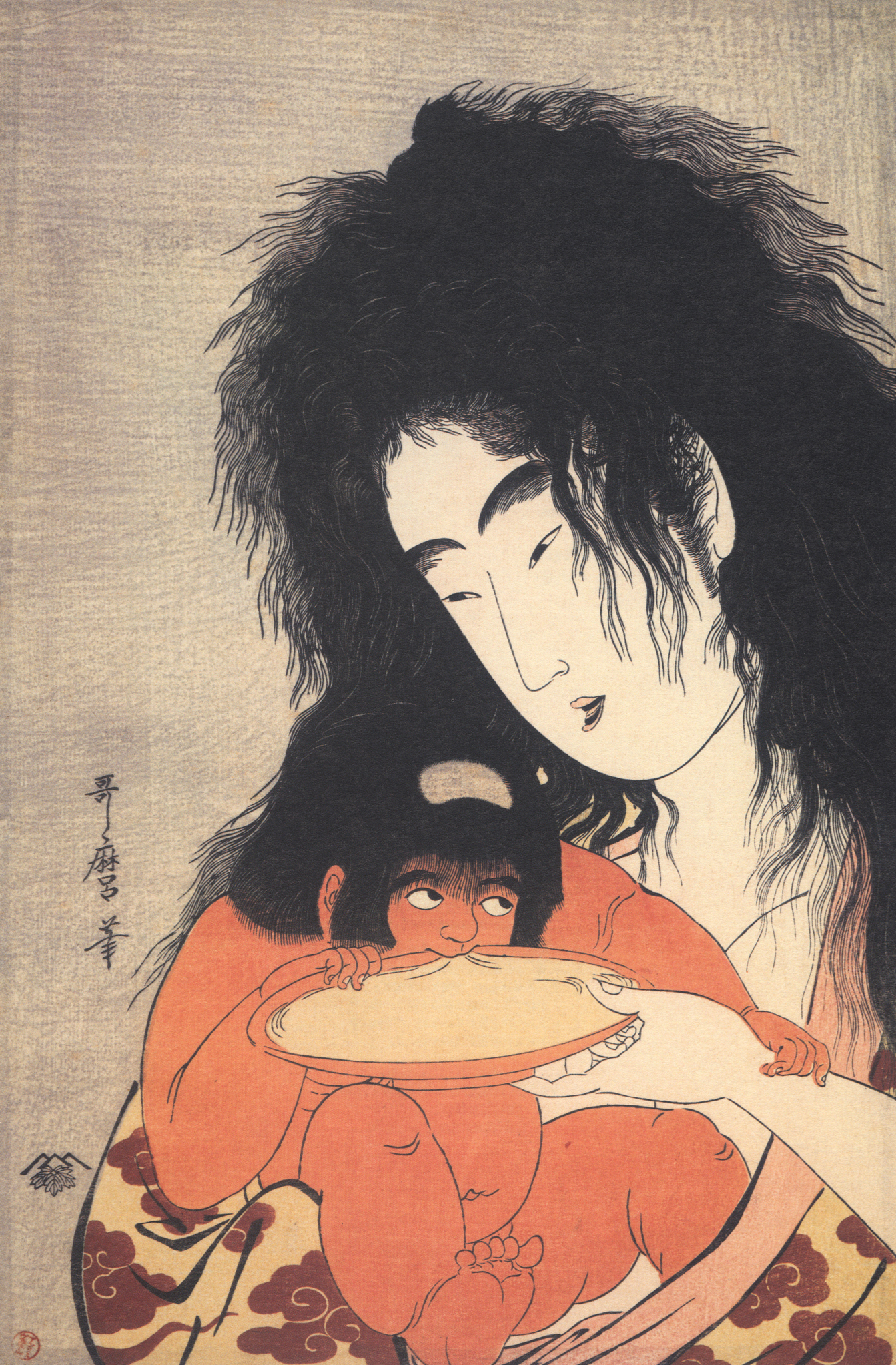
Ukiyo-e of Yama-uba caring for Kintarō in which her dark teeth are distinguishable

The first written references in Japan to ohaguro appear in the 11th century Tale of Genji and in the story Mushi Mezuru Himegimi, in English The Lady Who Loved Insects, from the 12th century, included in the Tsutsumi Chūnagon Monogatari. In the story, the protagonist's eccentric behavior is considered less reprehensible than her repulsive natural appearance, and a maiden describes her completely unplucked eyebrows as "hairy caterpillars" and her undyed teeth as "skinless caterpillars", while a captain of the guard who shows attraction to her is repelled by her lack of makeup and, above all, by her teeth which "shone horribly when she smiled."

The tradition first appeared among men and women of the Heian period aristocracy between the 9th and 11th centuries, which was soon followed by women of all social classes. It began as a rite of maturity among adolescent girls that by the end of this period had spread to noblemen. During the later Kamakura period, when aristocrats such as those belonging to the Taira clan, other samurai, and almost all nobles came of age, they dyed their teeth. In the particular case of samurai and members of the nobility of these periods it was customary to dye their teeth for the first time upon passing their genpuku or initiation ceremony, at the age of fifteen or sixteen. This was also how it was done in the court of the Imperial Family until the end of the Edo period. Although its specific use by elites was soon diluted and came to be considered acceptable among commoner women, especially among married women and geisha, it was a forbidden practice for the marginalized or burakumin, vagrants and the poorest of the poor.

During the Muromachi period, ohaguro was common among adults, although even before the advent of the Sengoku period it was more often among nobles as a sign of the passage into puberty and was done on boys and especially girls entering that stage, around the age of 13. In the celebration of marriages, those relatives of the bride who were responsible for assisting her in the process and introducing her to others were given the name kaneoya (鉄漿親) or kanetsuke-oya, literally "godmother" of kanetsuke (blackening of teeth).

Throughout these convulsive centuries, which saw the emergence of a multitude of daimyō at odds with each other and led to the wars of the Sengoku period, samurai would take the heads of their enemies and collect them as trophies after battle to enhance their reputation in the eyes of their daimyō. The heads were identified and in many cases received ohaguro after decapitation to enhance the combatant's glory in defeating a notable enemy. In the Oan Monogatari, in English The Story of Oan, the daughter of a servant of Ishida Mitsunari narrates this process after surviving the Battle of Sekigahara in 1600:

Our allies stacked the severed heads they had obtained in this part of the castle. We put a label on each of the heads so that we could identify them properly, then we dyed their teeth black repeatedly. Why did we do this? Long ago blackened teeth were admired as a symbol of a distinguished man. So we were asked to apply a generous coat of ohaguro to any head with white teeth.

— Eiko Ikegami

It was towards the end of this period that the men engaging in the practice became a minority.

During the Edo period, only men who were part of the Imperial Family and the aristocracy had their teeth blackened. Because of the strong odor and the effort required for the process, in addition to the impression among young women that it made them look older, ohaguro was only performed on women who were getting married or engaged, prostitutes, (Note: Also among the men who practiced prostitution, the kagema or yarō, who adopted the customs and manners of the women of the time.) and geisha. There are also mentions of ohaguro in fairy tales, such as Gon, the Little Fox, by Niimi Nankichi.

In 1870 the government banned the practice of ohaguro on men, and the tradition gradually became obsolete, especially from 1873 among married and noblewomen, when the Empress Shōken decided to appear in public with white teeth. Until the last years of the Meiji period, ohaguro was still a popular custom among the middle and lower classes but from the Taishō period onwards it virtually disappeared except among elderly women in rural areas.

Nowadays, the only places where ohaguro can be seen are some Japanese festivals, in period films, in kabuki, and in some hanamachi (geisha districts), where some apprentice geisha have their teeth blackened during the last stage of their apprenticeship, erikae, before graduating to geisha status. The application of ohaguro and the hairstyle known as sakkō, both traditionally characteristic of Japanese newlyweds, is a symbol of their "marriage" to the arts they practice.

== Social consideration and role ==
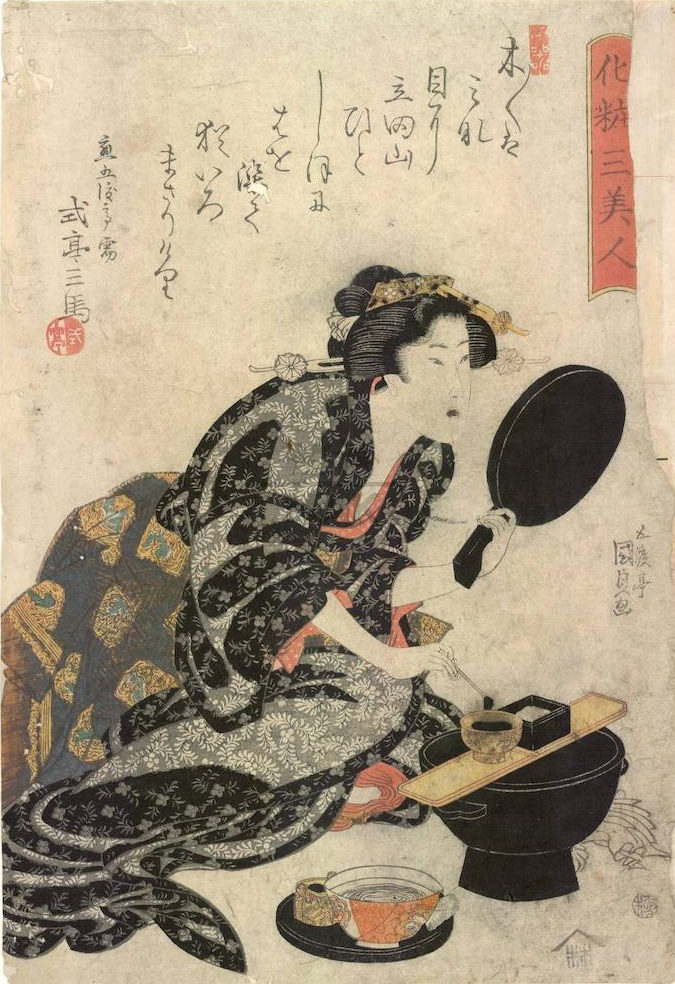
Nishiki-e by Utagawa Kunisada, from the series Three beauties making up their faces (1815). A geisha is seen making use of the complete set of traditional elements for blackening, most notably the mimidarai and watashigane as a support for the others.

Following the ending of Japan's self-isolation policy in the 1860s, a large number of Westerners who visited Japan – including Engelbert Kaempfer, Philipp Franz von Siebold and Rutherford Alcock, who visited Edo-period Japan – described ohaguro as "an abhorrent Japanese custom that disfigured their women", whom, in fact, many of them considered to be of great beauty until they smiled. Alcock surmised that its purpose would be chastity by intentionally making women unattractive, which would prevent potential extramarital affairs and his view of this custom hardly changed during his three-year stay in Japan: (Note: Other Westerners were not so severe in their appraisals, and some even mention having become accustomed to it and being able to observe without aversion, but among the testimonials none show appreciation for the custom.)

Once they have renewed the black varnish on their teeth and plucked every last hair from their eyebrows, Japanese married women could assert their unparalleled preeminence in artificial ugliness over the rest of their sex. Their mouths thus disfigured are like open sepulchers [...]

— Rutherford Alcock

Japanese sociologist Kyouji Watanabe disagrees with this theory. Considering that Japanese girls were allowed a high degree of social and sexual freedom until the moment of receiving the ohaguro, when they accepted their responsibility as a wife and mother, Watanabe posits that this was a social ritual by which both society and the young woman affirmed the determination of the woman who had matured.

== Dye ==
The main ingredient was a dark brown solution of iron acetate called kanemizu (鉄奨水, lit. 'iron juice water'), created by dissolving iron filings in vinegar. When the solution was combined with vegetable tannins from sources such as powdered galls of the Chinese sumac plant (fushi) or tea, it turned black and ceased to be soluble in water, the same method by which iron gall ink is produced. Covering the teeth with this liquid prevented decay of the teeth and enamel and was also said to ease the pain of dental ailments almost immediately. The dye faded quickly and had to be applied once a day or every few days to keep the dark shade even.

Among foreigners who knew of the custom, a rumor, never proven, spread that the ingredients also included urine. Bertram Freeman-Mitford transcribed in his Tales of Ancient Japan (1871) a recipe which he claimed had been described to him by a reputable apothecary in Yedo:

Take three pints of water, and, having warmed it, add half a teacupful of wine. Put into this mixture a quantity of red-hot iron; allow it to stand from five or six days, when there will be a scum on the top of the mixture, which should then be poured into a small teacup and placed near a fire. When it is warm, powdered gall-nuts and iron filings should be added to it, and the whole should be warmed again. The liquid is then painted on to the teeth by means of a soft feather brush, with more powdered gall-nuts and iron, and, after a few applications, the desired colour will be obtained.

— Mitford, A. B. (1966) [1871]. Tales of Old Japan. Charles E. Tuttle Company. p. 420. ISBN 9780804811606.

In kabuki theatrical performances, actors painted their teeth black whenever they played married women, courtesans, and with some noblemen, for which they traditionally used a mixture of brown sugar and pine resin. The mixture used in kabuki was given the name hayagane, and in more complex formulations could include wax, pine resin, carbon black, red pigment, rice honey, and lamp oil, all softened over a flame.

== Application ==
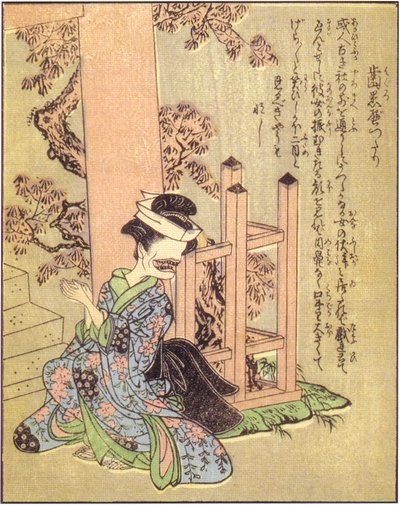
Ohaguro-bettari from Ehon Hyaku Monogatari, in English Picture book of a hundred stories, 1841

For the treatment, preservation and application of the dye, various containers and tools were used. Among these were the mimidarai, a large bowl with handles on which was placed the watashigane, a thin tray to hold the elements with which the dye was applied. The set of smaller items was kept inside a larger case: the haguro-bako, in which were kept the fushi-bako or small box for the gall powder; the haguro-tsugi, with which the dye was administered; and the ugai-chawan, a small porcelain bowl for gargling after the process.

Each time the procedure was repeated, the teeth were carefully rubbed with the peel of a pomegranate to form an adhesive surface for the dye. According to Freeman-Mitford, the dye should be applied at most every two days, because even after the first day without a new coat, the teeth lost their lacquered shine and pieces of gray were mixed with those that maintained the desired black color, resulting in an undesirable appearance.

== Superstitions, legends, and popular expressions ==
- During the Meiji period, an urban legend spread that the coal tar used as insulation at the beginning of the extension of electrical wiring throughout Japanese cities was actually composed in part of the blood of virgins, an idea that became associated with the Westerners who were originally in charge of installing the wires. To avoid being attacked and having their blood drawn, many young women decided to change their appearance to look like married women: they dyed their teeth black, painted their eyebrows, wore simple kimono, and styled their hair in the marumage style.
- In Yamada Norio's book Tohoku Kaidan no Tabi, in English Journey through the ghost stories of Tohoku, there is a story about Fukushima prefecture called ohaguro bettari (お歯黒べったり, lit. 'full of blackened teeth'). It is about a yōkai, more specifically a type of noppera-bō, dressed and made up in the old Japanese women's fashion, but on her made-up face appears only a large mouth full of black teeth.
- A legend from the island of Himeshima tells that when Himegami (姫神; Divine Princess) fled from Prince Tsunuga Arashito of the Gaya confederacy, she stopped for a moment on her journey to apply ohaguro. When she then wanted to rinse her mouth she found no water anywhere nearby, so she clapped her hands and water began to gush out of the ground. That is the reason why the Hyoshimizu spring at Himekoso shrine is also called ohaguro mizu ('ohaguro water').
- The main red-light district in the country between the 17th century and the prohibition of prostitution in Japan in 1958 was Yoshiwara, in Edo. The district was surrounded on all four sides by a small moat with water that received the name Ohaguro-dobu, literally 'Black Tooth Canal', because of the abundance of prostitutes with dyed teeth.

== Other parts of East Asia ==
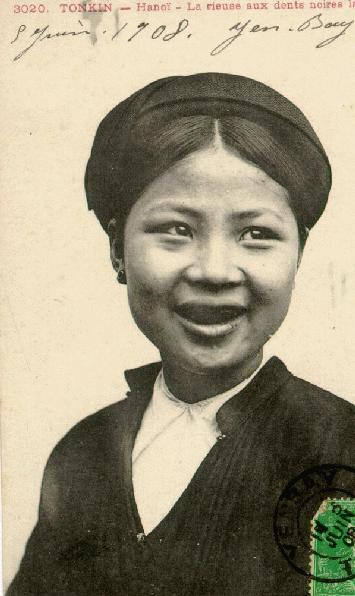
Young Tonkin girl with black painted teeth, c. 1905

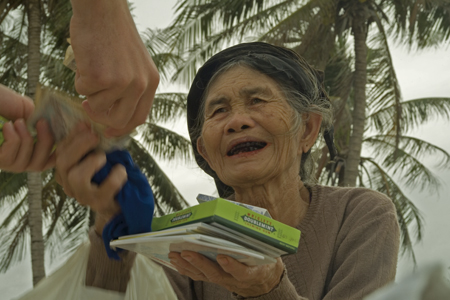
Vietnamese old woman selling chewing gum. Her teeth have the dark red hue of betel chewers.

In China there has been knowledge of the custom of teeth blackening throughout history, although it was not practiced in the domains of the Middle Kingdom, nor did the majority of its ethnic groups. As early as the 4th century BC's Shan Hai Jing, the description of a 'black-toothed country' or Hei-chi-guo (黒歯国) appears, which some associate with Japan itself and most others with the Southeast Asian area due to its extent in the region and greater antiquity.

In more modern times, tooth blackening can be observed among many minority groups in Southeast Asia. It is found preferentially among older women, although the practice still exists among some young girls. Sometimes artificial teeth were used to obtain black teeth although it is also very common outside Japan to achieve this result by continuously chewing betel nut, which gives a dark red shade instead of black, in addition to all sorts of plants collected mainly in the jungle.

The practice of teeth dyeing was very ancient in Vietnam, where it was considered a demonstration of maturity and readiness for marriage after puberty. It was also a demonstration of civilization, as there was an idea that white teeth belonged to animals, savages, and evil spirits, especially because of the presence of large protruding canines in all of them. The majority ethnic group in Vietnam, the Kinh, practiced this custom, as did various minority populations. Si La men painted their teeth red, while women painted their teeth black. These traditions declined in the 20th century, decade by decade with each new generation, although colonial medical reports from the 1930s stated that 80 percent of Tonkinese farmers had darkened teeth.

Peoples who practiced some form of tooth blackening outside of Japan include:

- In China, in Yunnan province, especially in Xishuangbanna prefecture, the ethnic groups: Jino, Blang, Dai, Yi, and Lisu.
- In Vietnam, the Si La, Kinh, Thổ, Nung, Maa, Mnong, and Rade ethnic groups.
- In Laos, the Khmu ethnic group.
- In Thailand, the Lahu, Akha, and Lisu ethnic groups.
- In Malaysia, the Malay, both in Peninsular Malaysia and Borneo, and the Jakun.
- In Indonesia, the Dusun, Dayak, Karo, Kodi, Alfur, Kedang, Ngada, Acehnese, Minangkabau, Makassar, Sundanese, Javanese, and Batak.
- In Philippines, the Isnag, Aeta, Bicolano, Mangyan, Mansaka, Mandaya, Manobo, Yakan, Ivatan, Tausug, Bagobo, Kankanaey, Igorot, Gaddang, Ilongote, and Ifugao.
- In the Pacific, the islands of Palau, Yap, and the Mariana Islands.

== See also ==
- Teeth blackening
- Culture of Japan
- Culture of Southeast Asia

== Bibliography ==
- Alcock, Rutherford (1863). The Capital of the Tycoon: A Narrative of a Three Years Residence in Japan. Longmanz.
- Casal, Ugo Alfonso (1966). Japanese cosmetics and teeth-blackening. Transactions of the Asiatic Society of Japan. Vol. 9. Asiatic Society of Japan. OCLC 31812278.
- Hara, Mitsumasa (1984). Ohaguro no kenkyū (in Japanese). Ningen no kagakusya. OCLC 23310601.
- Wagatsuma, Hiroshi (1967). "Color and Race". The Social Perception of Skin Color in Japan (PDF). Daedalus. Vol. 96. The MIT Press.
