= Bijin-ga =

Japanese woodblock prints of beautiful women

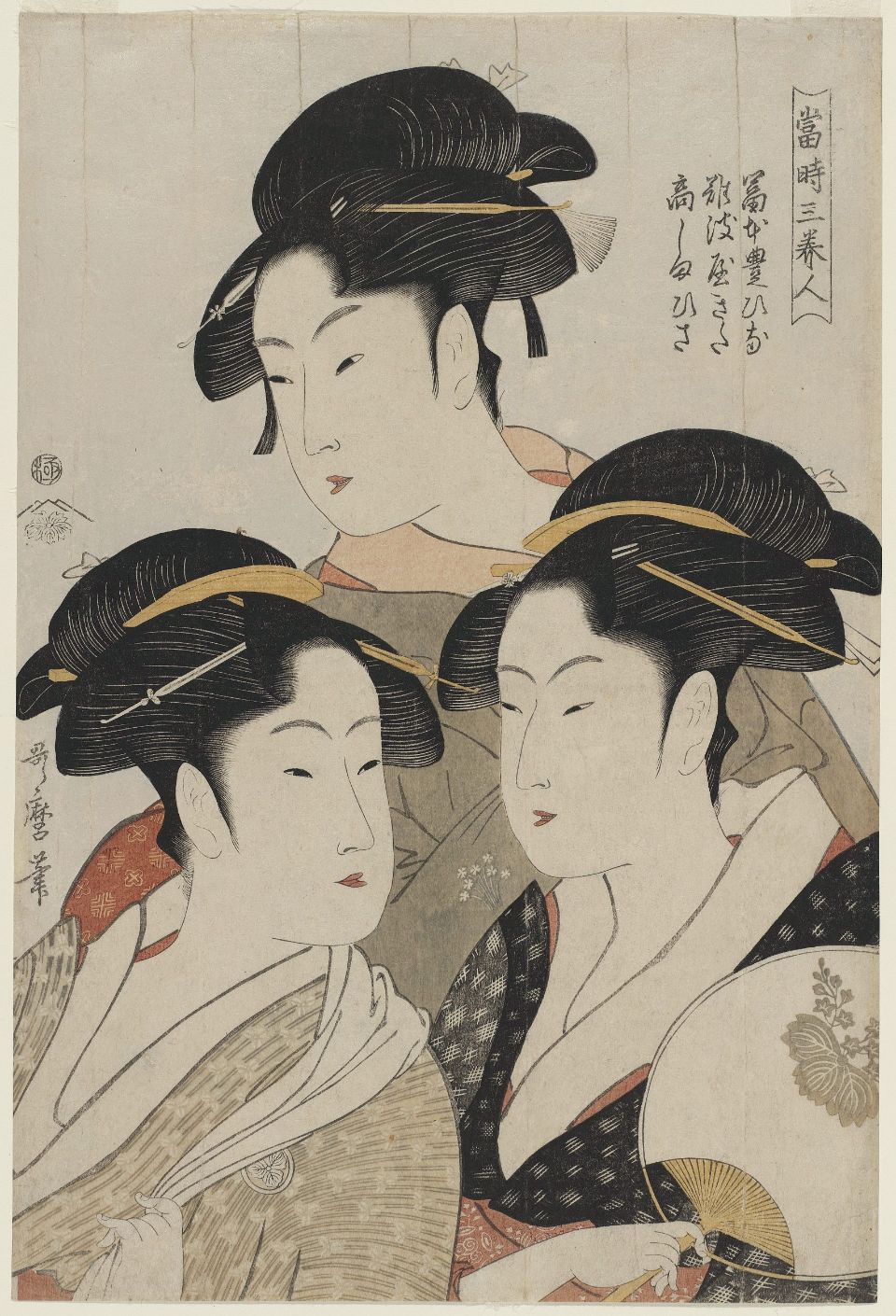
Three Beauties of the Present Day by Utamaro, 1793

Bijin-ga (美(び)人(じん)画(が), "pictures of beautiful people") is a generic term for pictures of conventionally attractive women (bijin) in Japanese art, especially in woodblock printing of the ukiyo-e genre.

== Definition ==
Kōjien defines bijin-ga as a picture that simply "emphasizes the beauty of women", and the Shincho Encyclopedia of World Art defines it as depiction of "the beauty of a woman's appearance". On the other hand, Gendai Nihon Bijin-ga Zenshū Meisaku-sen I defines bijin-ga as pictures that explore "the inner beauty of women". For this reason, the essence of bijin-ga cannot always be expressed only through the depiction of a bijin, a woman aligning with the beauty image. In fact, in ukiyo-e bijin-ga, it was not considered important that the picture resemble the facial features of the model, and the depiction of women in ukiyo-e bijin-ga is stylized rather than an attempt to create a realistic image; For example, throughout the Edo period (1603–1867), married women had a custom of shaving their eyebrows (hikimayu), but in bijin-ga, there was a rule to draw the eyebrows for married women.

== History ==
Ukiyo-e itself is a genre of woodblock prints and paintings that was produced in Japan from the 17th century to the 19th century. The prints were very popular amongst the Japanese merchants and the middle class of the time.

From the Edo period to the Meiji period (1868–1912), the technical evolution of ukiyo-e processes increased, with the accuracy of carving and printing and the vividness of colors used developing through the introduction of new printing processes and synthetic dyes. This technical development can also be seen in ukiyo-e bijin-ga, and many painters of bijin-ga contributed to the evolution of ukiyo-e techniques and styles, with the aim of maximizing the realistic expression of a real beauty living in the artists' time period.

Nearly all ukiyo-e artists produced bijin-ga, as it was one of the central themes of the genre. However, a few, including Utamaro, Suzuki Harunobu, Itō Shinsui, Toyohara Chikanobu, and Torii Kiyonaga, have been described as the greatest innovators and masters of the form.

Bijin-ga prints often depicted courtesans, offering members of the merchant middle class an image of a beauty they could rarely approach in person. Over time, women from a wider range of urban social backgrounds, including the daughters and wives of merchants and samurai noted for their elegance, also became subjects of the genre.

In the genre's shin-hanga revival, compositions frequently placed the bijin in domestic settings, engaged in activities conventionally associated with women's daily routines, such as applying powder, painting the lips red, arranging the hair before a mirror, or stepping out of the bath, with particular attention paid to clothing and hairstyle.

The term bijin-ga is also used for paintings that depict beautiful women with a brush, and the nihonga painter Uemura Shōen was awarded the Order of Culture for breaking new ground in bijin-ga by depicting a different type of beauty than what had been painted before.

== Gallery ==
Bijin-ga

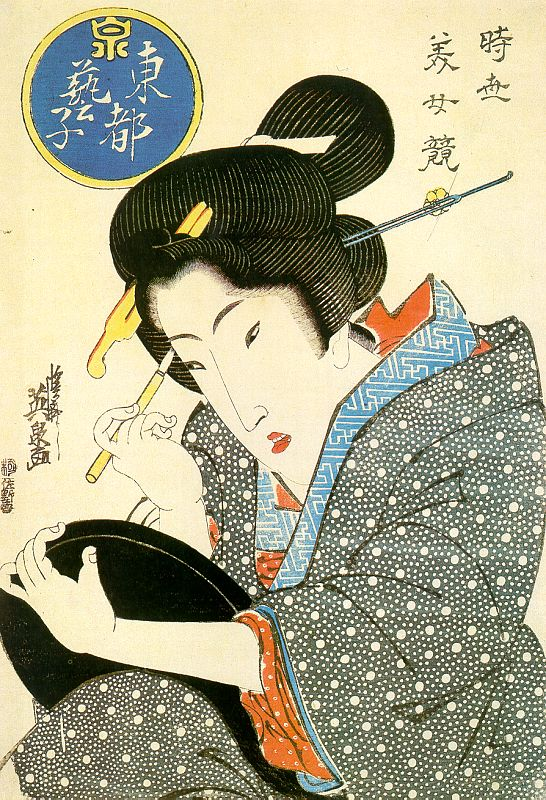
Bijin-ga by Keisai Eisen (1790–1848)

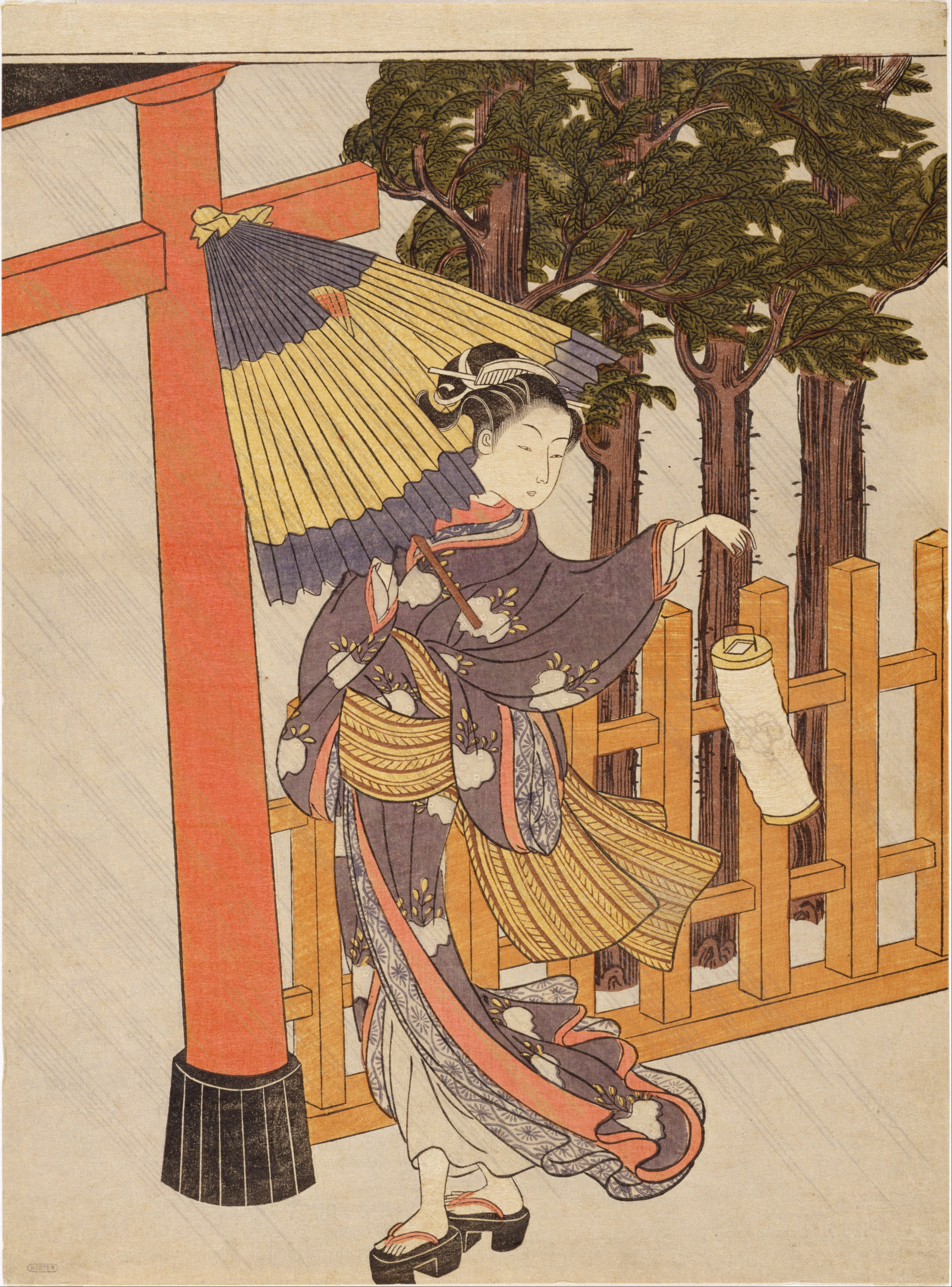
Woman Visiting the Shrine in the Night by Suzuki Harunobu (1725–1770)

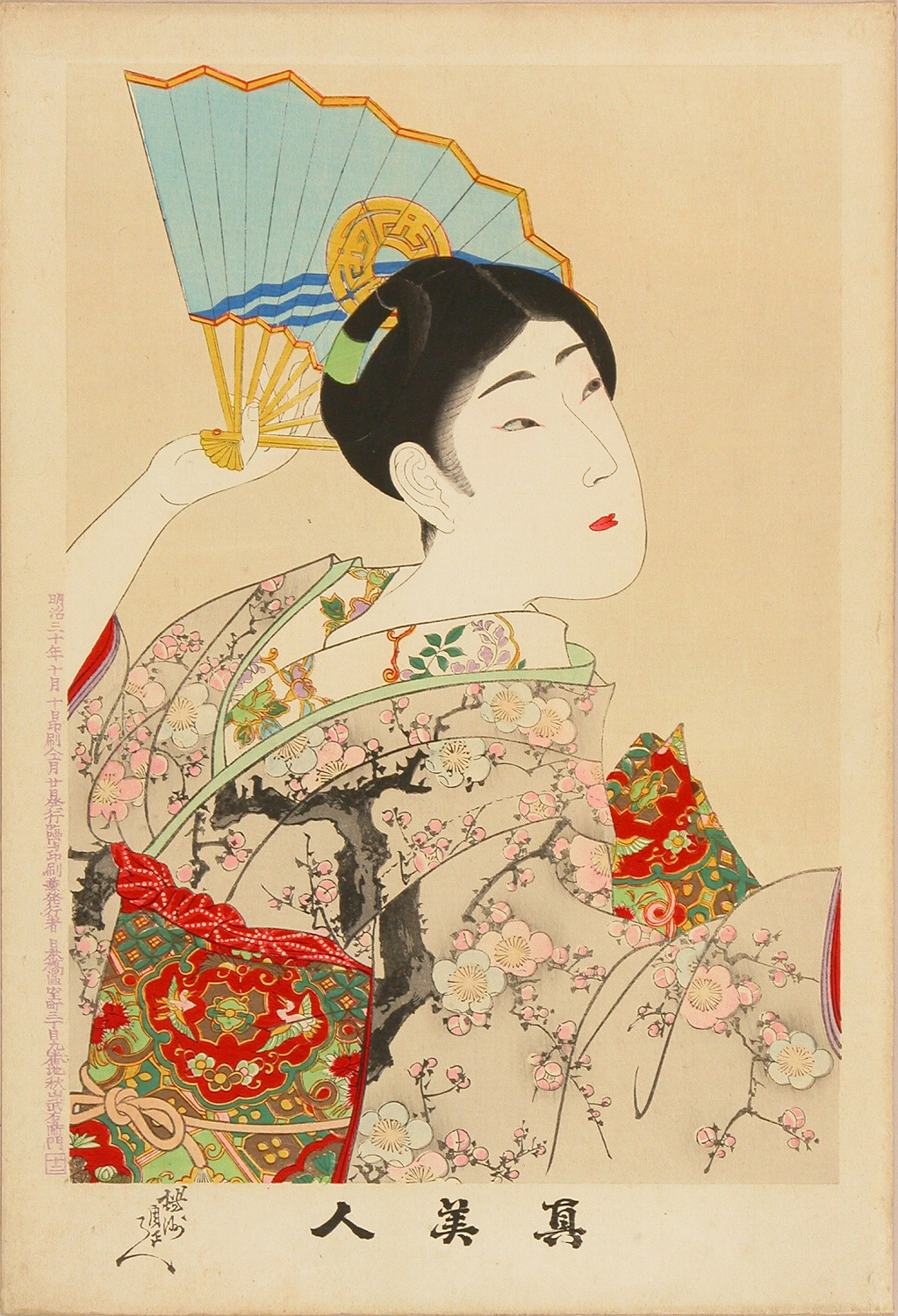
Shin Bijin, Shin Bijin series, No. 12 by Yōshū Chikanobu (1838–1912)

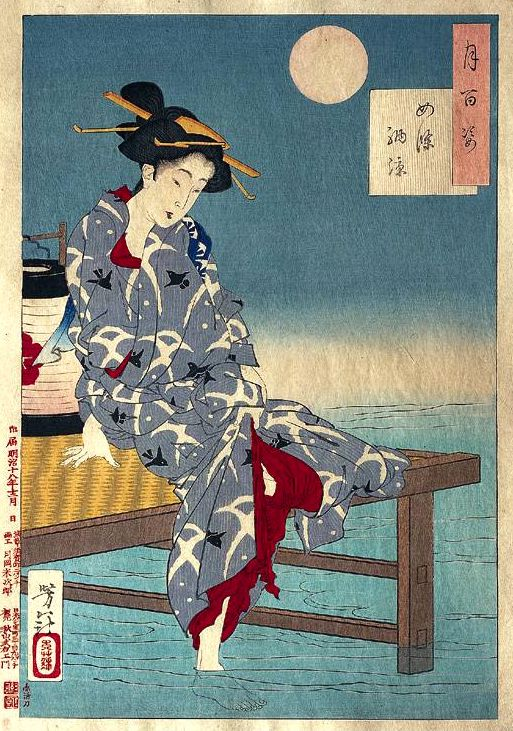
100 Aspects of the Moon by Yoshitoshi (1839–1892)

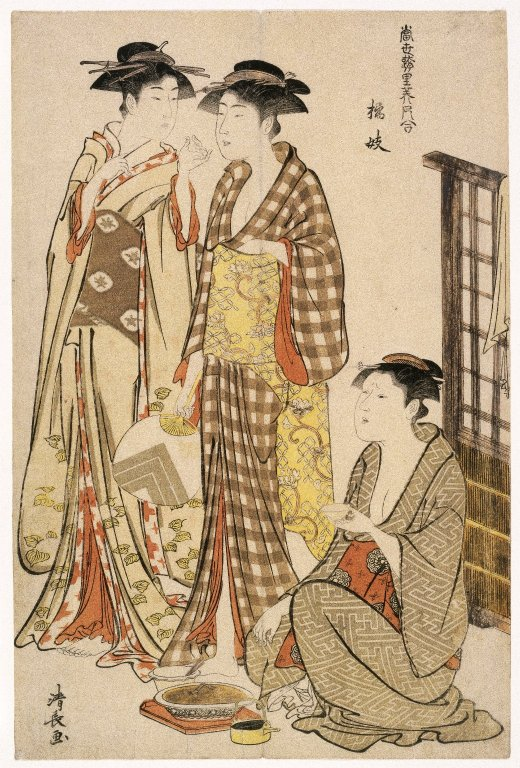
Two Women Standing from the series "Tosai Yuri Bijin Awase", by Torii Kiyonaga (1752–1815)

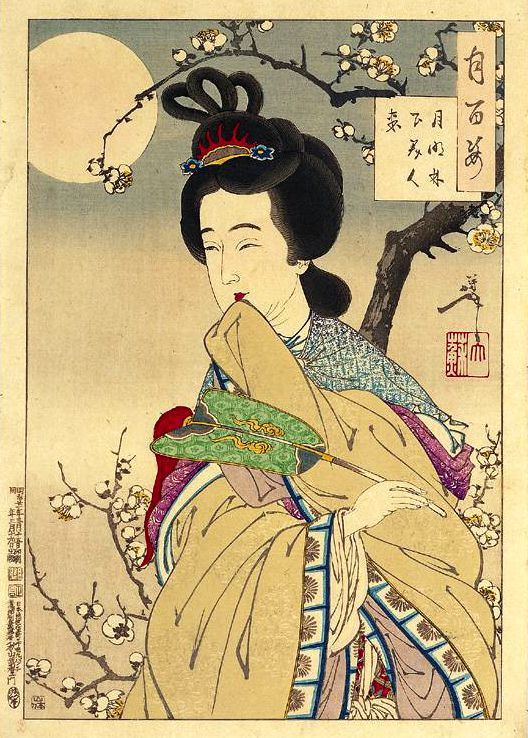
Woman with cherry flowers by Tsukioka Yoshitoshi

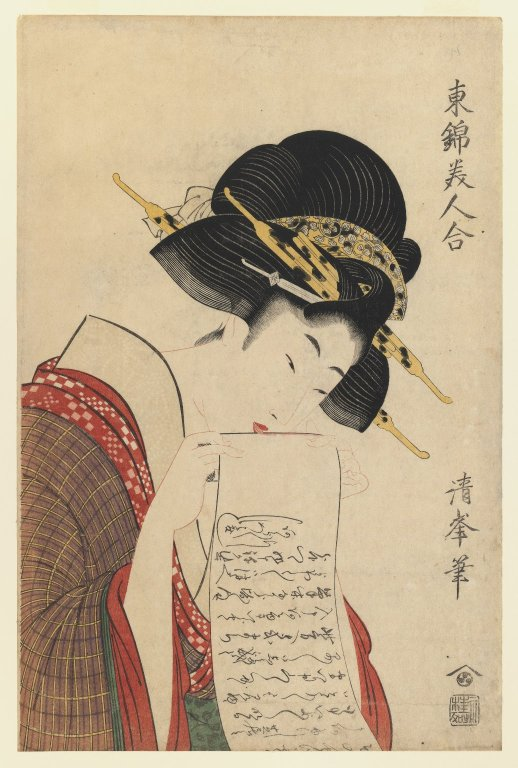
A Girl About to Despatch a Letter, by Torii Kiyomine (1786–1868)

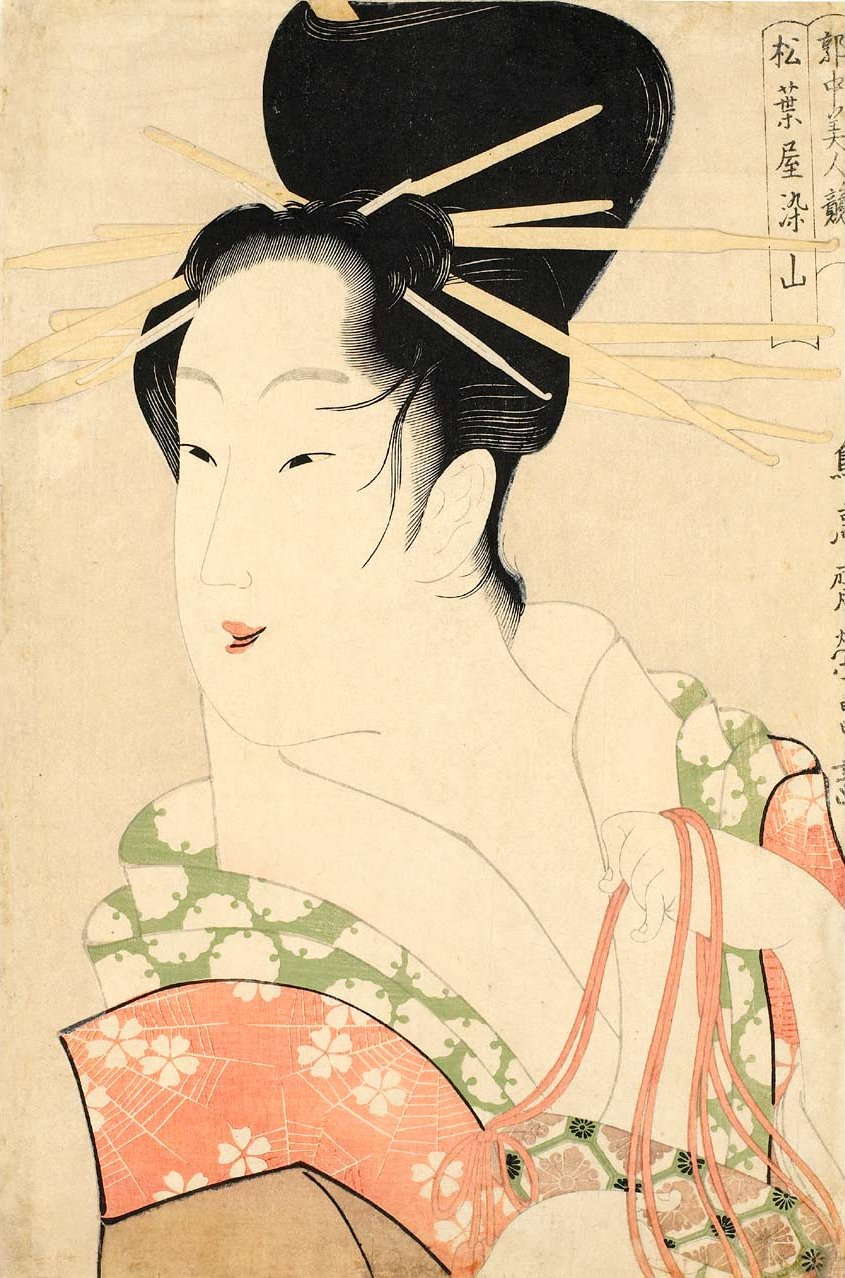
The Courtesan Someyama of the Matsubaya house, from the series Contest of Beauties in the Gay Quarters, by Eishosai Choki (active from about 1786 to 1808)

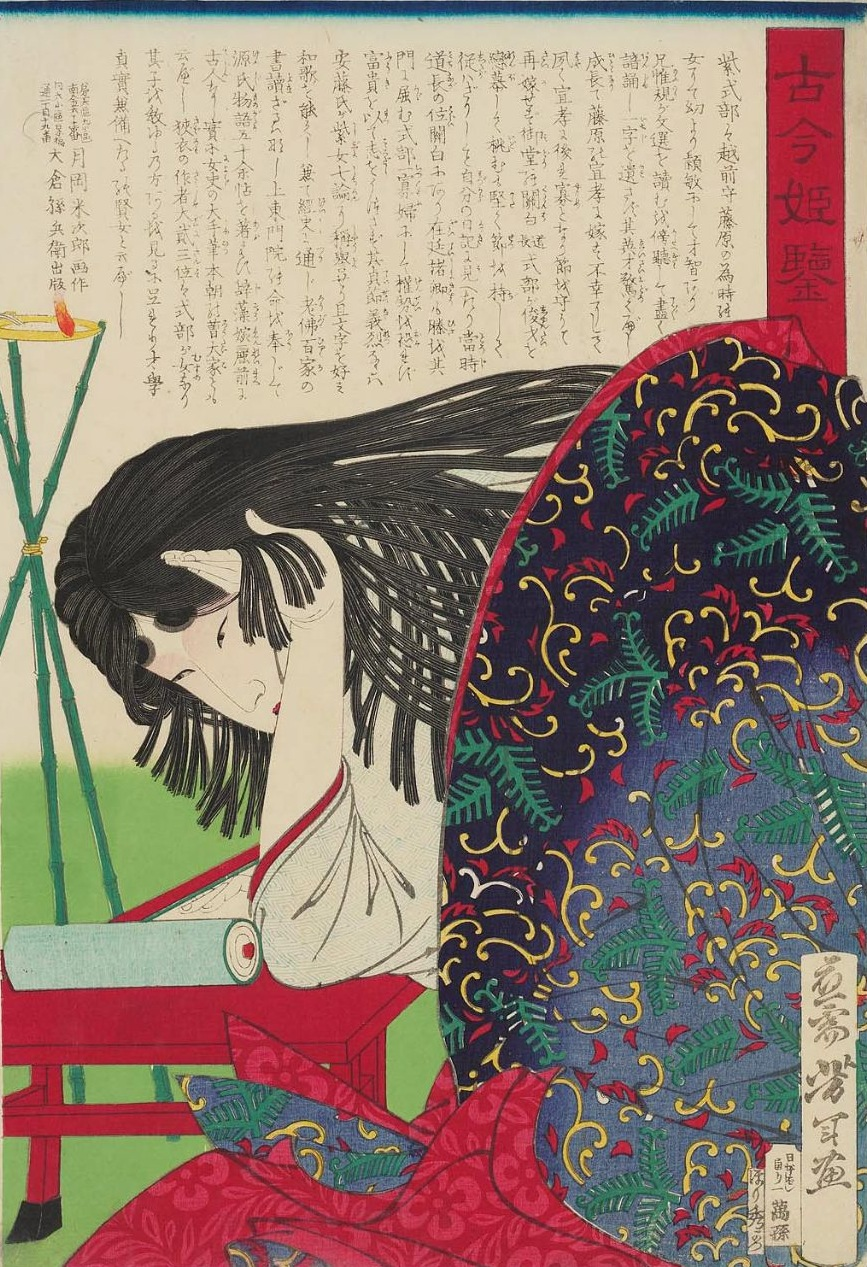
Murasaki Shikibu, from the series "Mirror of Women, Ancient and Modern" (古今姫鏡) by Tsukioka Yoshitoshi (1839–1892)
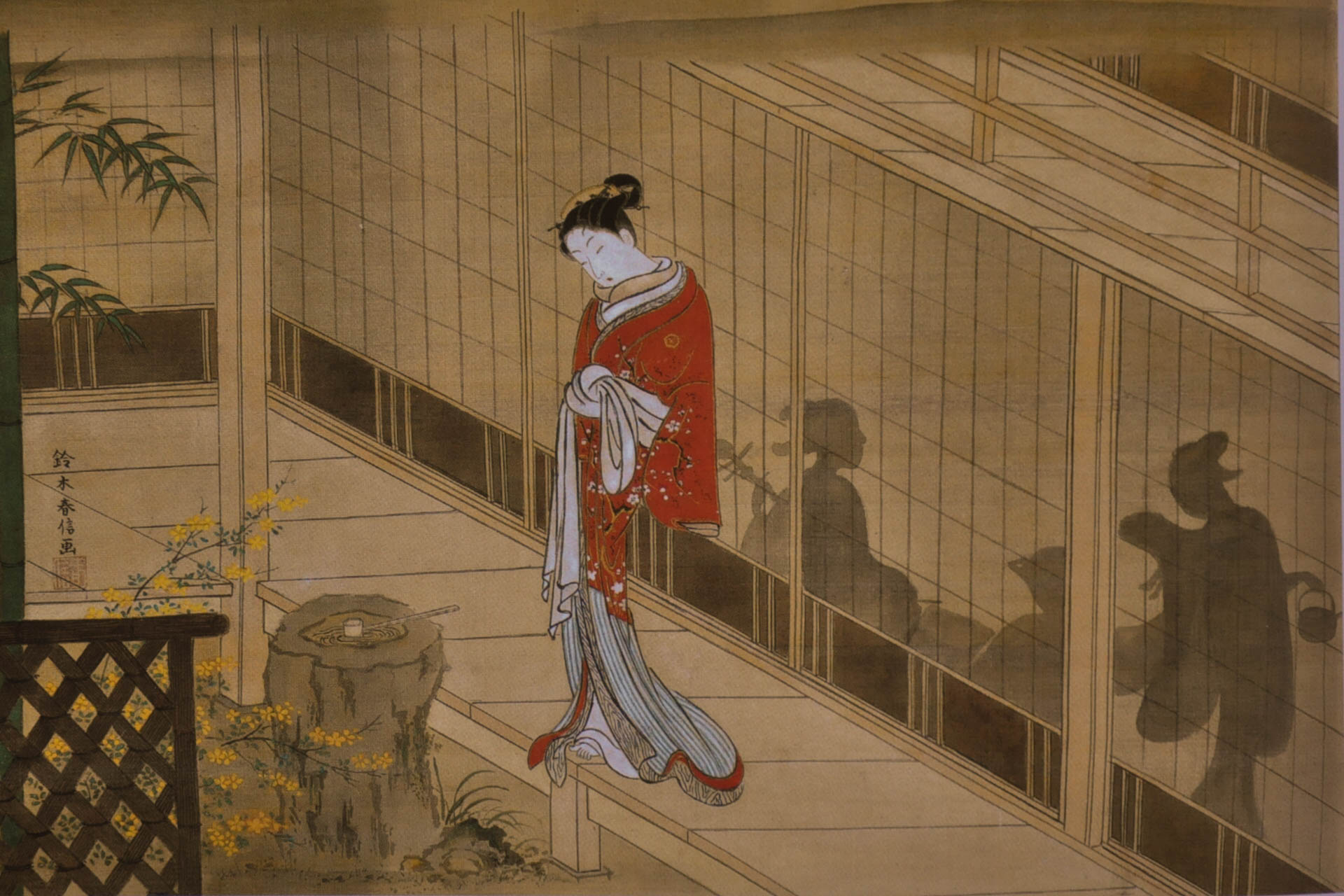
Woman in the night, by Suzuki Harunobu, c. 1765–1770

Bathhouse women, by Torii Kiyonaga (1752–1815)

== See also ==
- Bijin
- Bihaku
