= Hikimayu =

Japanese cosmetic tradition

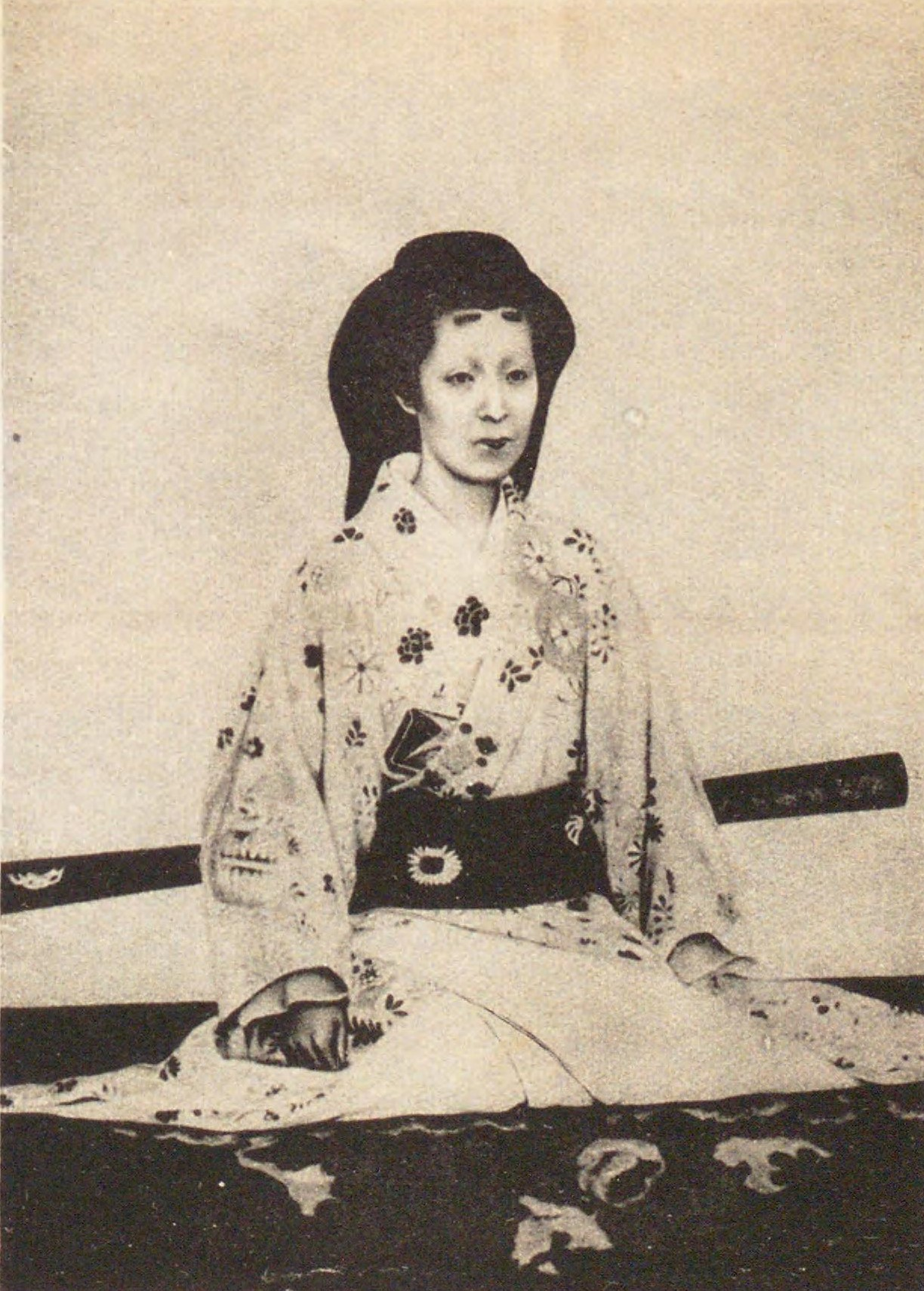
Mikako Tokugawa, wife of Yoshinobu Tokugawa, with hikimayu

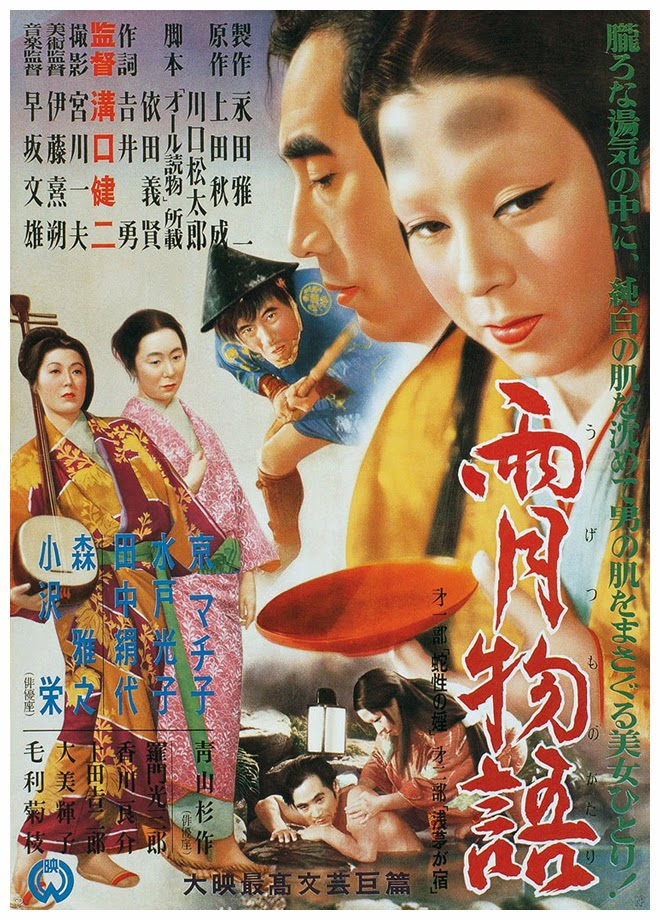
A poster for the 1953 film Ugetsu. The woman in the foreground has hikimayu.

Hikimayu (引眉) was the practice of removing the natural eyebrows and painting smudge-like eyebrows on the forehead in pre-modern Japan, particularly in the Heian period (794–1185).

Hiki means "pull" and mayu means "eyebrows". Aristocratic women used to pluck or shave their eyebrows and paint new ones using a powdered ink called haizumi, which was made of soot from sesame or rapeseed oils.

== History ==
Hikimayu first appeared in the eighth century, when the Japanese court adopted Chinese customs and styles. Japanese noblewomen started painting their faces with a white powder called oshiroi. One putative reason for hikimayu was that removing the natural eyebrows made it easier to put on the oshiroi. At this time, eyebrows were painted in arc shapes, as in China. Women also started painting their teeth black, known as ohaguro.

Japanese culture began to flourish in its own right during the Heian period (794–1185 CE) at the Imperial Court in Kyoto. With the turn away from Chinese culture, Japanese courtiers began to wear elaborate clothing – the jūnihitoe for women and the sokutai for men – in color combinations symbolising the change of the seasons and stylised views of nature. Women also began to paint their faces more thickly, and began painting their eyebrows as ovals or ovoid smudges on their foreheads, above the placement of their natural eyebrows.

One theorised reason behind the move towards highly-stylised eyebrows is that as hairstyles on women transitioned into long hair left to hang down naturally on each side of the face, the forehead became too prominent, and that painting the eyebrows as ovals halfway up the forehead redressed this balance.

The practice of hikimayu continued even into the latter portion of the Heian period; men in particular painted their faces white, blackened their teeth and redrew their eyebrows in its later years. As a fashion for women, hikimayu lasted for a number of centuries afterwards. In Noh drama, which started in the 14th century, the masks for the roles of young women typically have eyebrows in the hikimayu style.

Beginning in the Edo period (1603–1867), both hikimayu and ohaguro transitioned into a practice seen only on married women. In the latter half of the 19th century, the Japanese government ended its policy of isolationism and started to adopt Western culture. Eyebrows painted on the forehead and blackened teeth were considered no longer appropriate for modern society, and in 1870 hikimayu and ohaguro were banned.

In the modern day, hikimayu and ohaguro are typically only seen in historical drama pieces such as Noh and kabuki, and occasionally in local festivals. Apprentice geisha in some quarters of Japan - typically in Kyoto - may also practice ohaguro before graduating into geisha status.

== In literature ==
Hikimayu is mentioned in both of the great literary classics of the Heian period, The Tale of Genji and The Pillow Book. The passage from The Tale of Genji, near the end of the sixth chapter, concerns a girl aged about ten who is living in the palace of the Emperor Nijo. The original Japanese, romanization, and Edward Seidensticker's translation are as follows.

古代の祖母君の御なごりにて、歯黒めも まだしかりけるを、ひきつくろはせたまへれば、眉のけざやかになりたるも、うつくしうきよらなり。

Kotai no Oba-Gimi no ohom-nagori ni te, ha-gurome mo madasikari keru wo, hiki-tukuroha se tamahe re ba, mayu no kezayaka ni nari taru mo, utukusiu kiyora nari.

Because of her grandmother's conservative preferences, her teeth had not yet been blackened or her eyebrows plucked. Genji had put one of the women to blackening her eyebrows, which drew fresh, graceful arcs.

The translation by Royall Tyler is:

In deference to her grandmother's old-fashioned manners her teeth had not yet received any blacking, but he had had her made up, and the sharp line of her eyebrows was very attractive.

In Meredith McKinney's translation of the Pillow Book, section 80 reads:

物のあはれ知らせがほなるもの—鼻たるまもなく、かみてものいふ聲。まゆぬくも。

Things that create the appearance of deep emotion (Note: "Deep emotion" translates 物のあはれ mono no aware lit. 'the sadness of things') – The sound of your voice when you're constantly blowing your runny nose as you talk. Plucking your eyebrows.

== In cinema ==
Hikimayu can be seen in the films Rashomon, Ugetsu, and Ran. In the first two films, hikimayu can be seen on actress Machiko Kyō: in Rashomon, which is set in the Heian period, she plays a samurai's wife; in Ugetsu, also known as Ugetsu Monogatari, set in the Sengoku (civil war) period of 1493–1573, she plays the ghost of a noblewoman. In Ran, which is based on King Lear, hikimayu can be seen on Mieko Harada as Lady Kaede.
