= Kikumaro =

Kikumaro is a Japanese name. It may refer to:

- Tsukimaro, an early-19th-century Japanese artist who also worked under the name Kikumaro
- Prince Yamashina Kikumaro (1873–1908), a prince of the Japanese imperial family
