= Tsuitate no Danjo =

Woodblock print by Kitagawa Utamaro

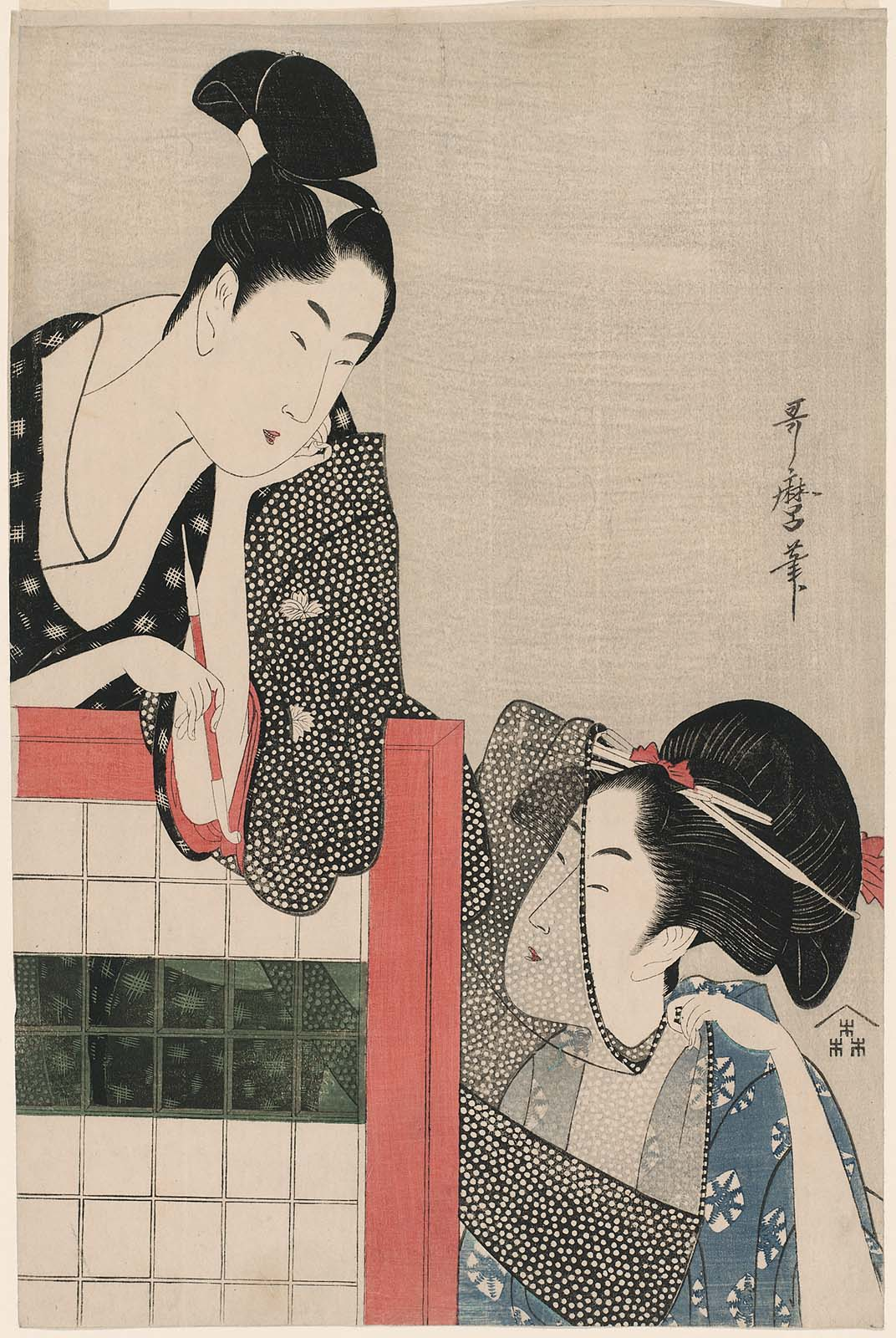
Tsuitate no Danjo

Tsuitate no Danjo (衝立の男女, "Man and Woman by a Partitioning Screen", c. 1797) is a title given to a multicolour print by the Japanese ukiyo-e artist Kitagawa Utamaro. It depicts a young man and woman by a tsuitate partitioning screen. The print delivers the feeling of several layers of translucency as the woman peers through the folded cloth of the man's haori and the man is seen through a silk gauze–covered portion of the tsuitate.

== Background ==
Ukiyo-e art flourished in Japan during the Edo period from the 17th to 19th centuries, and took as its primary subjects courtesans, kabuki actors, and others associated with the "floating world" lifestyle of the pleasure districts. Alongside paintings, mass-produced woodblock prints were a major form of the genre. In the mid-18th century full-colour nishiki-e prints became common, printed using a large number of woodblocks, one for each colour. A prominent genre was bijin-ga ("pictures of beauties"), which depicted most often courtesans and geisha at leisure, and promoted the entertainments of the pleasure districts.

Kitagawa Utamaro (c. 1753–1806) made his name in the 1790s with his bijin ōkubi-e ("large-headed pictures of beautiful women") portraits, focusing on the head and upper torso, a style others had previously employed in portraits of kabuki actors. Utamaro experimented with line, colour, and printing techniques to bring out subtle differences in the features, expressions, and backdrops of subjects from a wide variety of class and background. Utamaro's individuated beauties were in sharp contrast to the stereotyped, idealized images that had been the norm.

== Description and analysis ==
Tsuitate no Danjo is a multicolour nishiki-e print made with ink on handmade washi paper in ōban size, about 39 by 26 centimetres (15 in × 10 in). It was published in c. 1797 by Moriya Jihei. It bears the mark of Moriya's publishing house Kinshindō and the seal Utamaro hitsu (歌麿筆, "the brush of Utamaro").

A wakashū (adolescent male) and young woman stand by a tsuitate portable partition, of a type covered with silk gauze over an opening in the middle to allow a breeze to pass through in the heat of summer. The woman crouches and peers through a portion of the man's light summer haori. It folds over at the bottom, so that it is less translucent there, and the man's lower body is also seen through the gauze of the tsuitate, so that the print produces multiple levels of the translucent effect. The translucent effect in the prints required the highest level of skill from their carvers.
