= The Coiffure =

Drypoint and aquatint print by Mary Cassatt

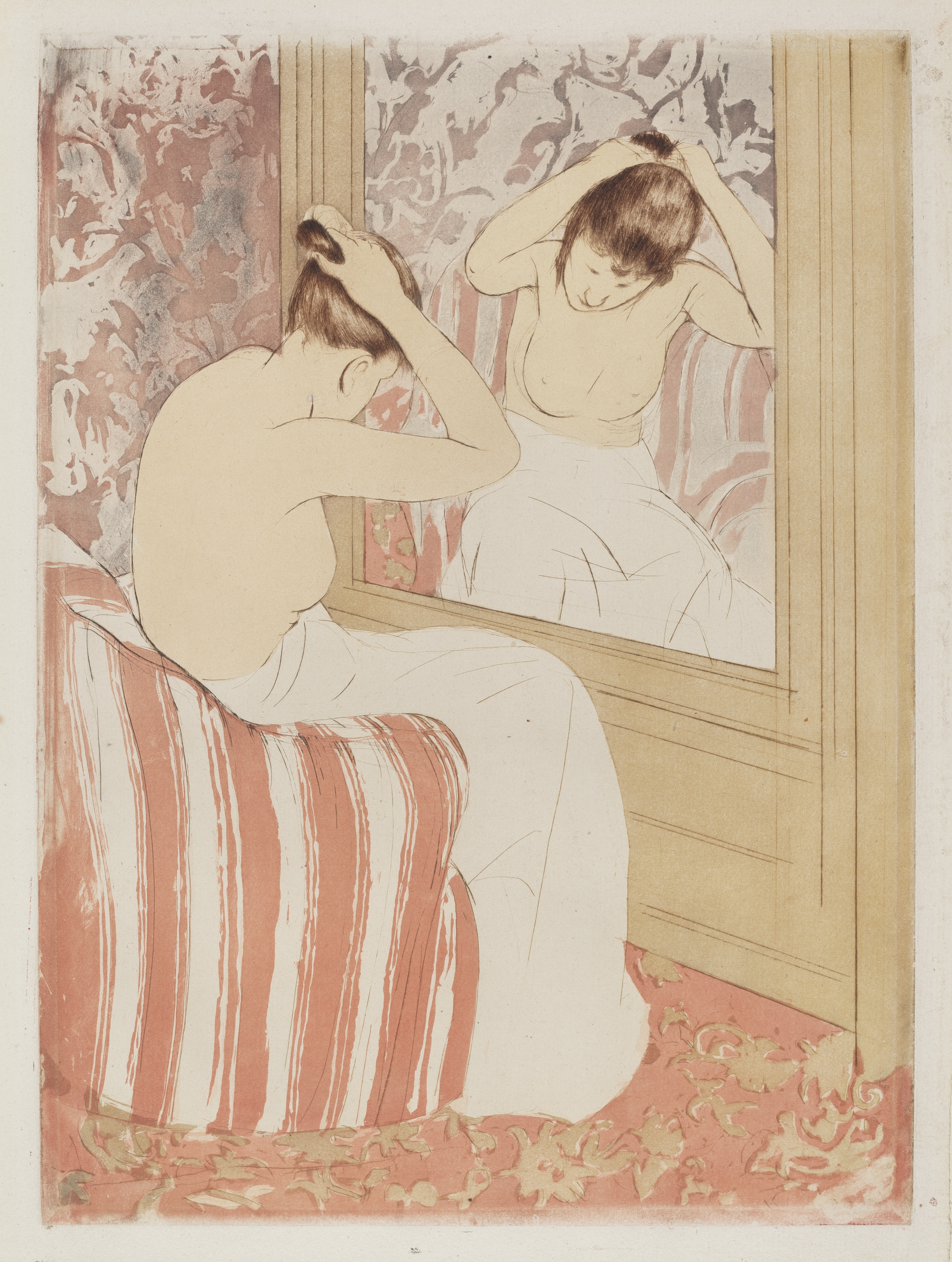
- A version of The Coiffure held in the National Gallery of Art
- Artist: Mary Cassatt
- Year: 1890–1891
- Medium: Drypoint and aquatint in color on laid paper
- Dimensions: varies (Note: Due to different versions of the piece being produced, dimensions of the piece listed by the museums such as Cleveland Museum of Art, Metropolitan Museum of Art, and National Gallery of Art, among others, all list similar yet different figures.)

The Coiffure (known as La Coiffure in French) is a drypoint and aquatint print by the American printmaker and painter Mary Cassatt. Made in 1890–1891, the work was inspired by Cassatt's attendance of an exhibition of Japanese woodblock prints, known as Ukiyo-e.

== History ==
The Coiffure is a print produced by American printmaker and painter Mary Cassatt in 1890–1891. It was part of a series of ten color prints depicting women in everyday activities. Cassatt was inspired to create the piece after viewing a Paris exhibition of Japanese woodblock prints organized by the École des Beaux-Arts in April 1890. Cassatt wrote a letter later in the week to her friend and fellow painter, Berthe Morisot, expressing her fascination with the Japanese prints.

In the fall of 1890 and winter of 1891, Cassatt made hundreds of drypoint etchings in her studio, including The Coiffure. The dimensions of The Coiffure vary depending on its version. Cassatt employed a drypoint and aquatint etching process in the print's production. One version was on laid paper. A study for The Coiffure was made with black crayon and graphite on wove paper.

Cassatt's piece was partially inspired by the 18th-century print Takashima Ohisa Using Two Mirrors to Observe Her Coiffure by Kitagawa Utamaro, which she had in her personal collection. Cassatt's Coiffure shows a nude woman adjusting her hair bun. The nudity of the model is intentionally abstracted, as a result of Cassatt's homage to the Japanese style. Cassatt also produced a companion piece to The Coiffure, titled Woman Bathing.

Since Cassatt's death in 1926, different versions of The Coiffure have been exhibited at various museums and galleries. Its provenance includes one version being held by the estate of Charles T. Brooks in Cleveland, Ohio through 1941, when it was then moved to the Cleveland Museum of Art. The National Gallery of Art has exhibited it in 1948, 1950, 1963, and 1970. More recently, the Guggenheim Museum and Yokohama Museum of Art exhibited the work in 2009 and 2016, respectively.

== Versions ==
Image	Museum/Gallery	City	Dimensions	Ref.
	Art Institute of Chicago	Chicago, Illinois	Image/plate: 36.5 × 26.7 cm (14 3/8 × 10 9/16 in.); Sheet: 43.3 × 33 cm (17 1/16 × 13 in.)	
	Art Institute of Chicago	Chicago, Illinois	Image/plate: 36.4 × 26.7 cm (14 3/8 × 10 9/16 in.); Sheet: 43.3 × 33 cm (17 1/16 × 13 in.)	
	Baltimore Museum of Art	Baltimore, Maryland	Plate: 365 × 266 mm. (14 3/8 × 10 1/2 in.); Sheet: 433 × 300 mm. (17 1/16 × 11 13/16 in.)	
	Bibliothèque nationale de France	Paris, France	Image: 36.2 × 26.5 cm Sheet: 42.7 × 30 cm	
	Carnegie Museum of Art	Pittsburgh, Pennsylvania	Image: 36.99 × 26.83 cm (14 9/16 × 10 9/16 in.); Sheet: 43.02 × 30.48 cm (16 15/16 × 12 in.)	
	Cleveland Museum of Art	Cleveland, Ohio	Plate: 36.8 × 26.7 cm (14 1/2 × 10 1/2 in.)	
	Metropolitan Museum of Art	New York City, New York	Plate: 36.2 × 26.7 cm (14 1/4 × 10 1/2 in.); Sheet: 43.5 × 29.5 cm (17 1/8 × 11 5/8 in.)	
	Metropolitan Museum of Art	New York City, New York	Plate: 36.5 × 26.4 cm (14 3/8 × 10 3/8 in.); Sheet: 47.1 × 31 cm (18 9/16 × 12 3/16 in.)	
	Museum of Fine Arts, Boston	Boston, Massachusetts	Plate: 36.5 × 26.2 cm (14 3/8 × 10 5/16 in.); Sheet: 48 × 30.5 cm (18 7/8 × 12 in.)	
	Museum of Fine Arts, Boston	Boston, Massachusetts	Plate: 36.5 × 26.8 cm (14 3/8 × 10 9/16 in.); Sheet: 43 × 30.5 cm (16 15/16 × 12 in.)	
	National Gallery of Art	Washington, D.C.	Plate: 36.6 × 26.7 cm (14 7/16 × 10 1/2 in.); Sheet: 43.3 × 30.2 cm (17 1/16 × 11 7/8 in.)	
	National Gallery of Art	Washington, D.C.	Plate: 36.5 × 26.7 cm (14 3/8 × 10 1/2 in.); Sheet: 43.2 × 30.7 cm (17 × 12 1/16 in.)	
	National Gallery of Art	Washington, D.C.	Plate: 36.51 × 26.67 cm (14 3/8 × 10 1/2 in.); Sheet: 48 × 31.6 cm (18 7/8 × 12 7/16 in.)	
	National Gallery of Art	Washington, D.C.	Plate: 36.51 × 26.67 cm (14 3/8 × 10 1/2 in.); Sheet: 41.2 × 27 cm (16 1/4 × 10 5/8 in.)	
	National Gallery of Canada	Ottawa, Ontario	Plate: 36.5 × 26.8 cm Sheet: 43.6 × 30.3 cm	
	New York Public Library	New York City, New York	Image 36.5 × 26.7 cm. (14 3/8 × 10 1/2 in.); Sheet 43 × 30.5 cm. (16 15/16 × 12 in.)	
	Worcester Art Museum	Worcester, Massachusetts	Image: 36.3 × 26.7 cm (14 5/16 × 10 1/2 in.); Sheet: 43 × 30.3 cm (16 15/16 × 11 15/16 in.)	

== See also ==
- List of works by Mary Cassatt
