= Hokkoku Goshiki-zumi =

Series of five ukiyo-e prints designed by the Japanese artist Utamaro

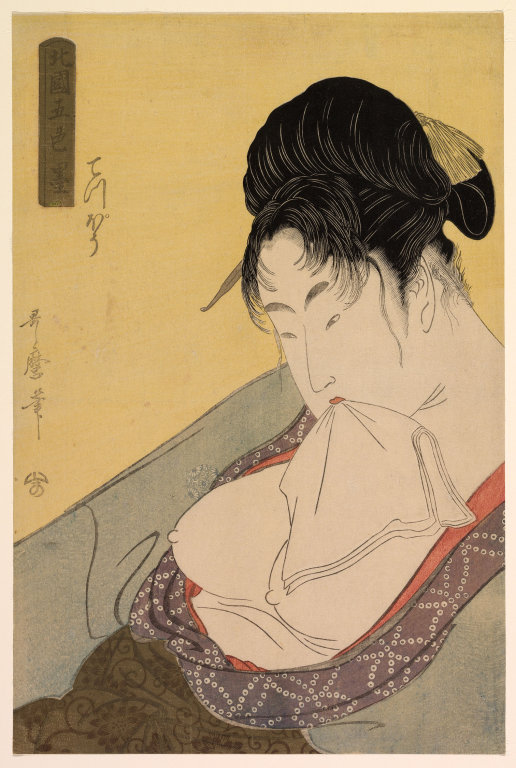
Teppō

Hokkoku Goshiki-zumi (北国五色墨, "Five Shades of Ink in the Northern Quarter") is a series of five ukiyo-e prints designed by the Japanese artist Utamaro and published in c. 1794–95.

The prints depict and contrast women who work in or near the exclusive pleasure district of Yoshiwara in the administrative capital of Edo (modern Tokyo). They range from the highest ranks—highly-trained and expensive geisha and oiran—to the lowest prostitutes outside the walls of Yoshiwara. Each is printed on a yellowish background and bears a different-coloured inkstick-shaped cartouche in the corner displaying the series name. The title alludes to and puns on the name of a haikai poetry anthology that appeared in 1731.

== Background ==
Ukiyo-e art flourished in Japan during the Edo period from the 17th to 19th centuries, and took as its primary subjects courtesans, kabuki actors, and others associated with the "floating world" lifestyle of the pleasure districts. The most famous of these was Yoshiwara, an enclosed district with one gated entrance enclosing a world of prostitutes, who spent their lives there.

Alongside paintings, mass-produced woodblock prints were a major form of the ukiyo-e genre. In the mid-18th century full-colour nishiki-e prints became common, printed using a large number of woodblocks, one for each colour. A prominent genre was bijin-ga ("pictures of beauties"), which depicted most often courtesans and geisha at leisure, and promoted the entertainments of the pleasure districts.

Kitagawa Utamaro (c. 1753–1806) made his name in the 1790s with his bijin ōkubi-e ("large-headed pictures of beautiful women") portraits, focusing on the head and upper torso, a style others had previously employed in portraits of kabuki actors. Utamaro experimented with line, colour, and printing techniques to bring out subtle differences in the features, expressions, and backdrops of subjects from a wide variety of class and background. Utamaro's individuated beauties were in contrast to the stereotyped, idealized images that had been the norm.

== Description and analysis ==
Rather than famed courtesans, as was typical in his own work and ukiyo-e in general, Utamaro depicts and contrasts a range of women who work in the pleasure district of Yoshiwara in Edo. He portrays four prostitutes of different ranks (oiran representing the highest) and one a geisha.

The prints are multicolour nishiki-e prints in ōban size—about 37 by 25 centimetres (15 in × 10 in). (Note: Precise sizes vary, and paper was often trimmed after printing.) They were published by Iseya Magobei, and are believed to be the earliest he published. They bear his seal: 山可, reading yama ("mountain") and yoshi or beku ("good"). Each portrait is printed on a yellowish backgrounds; the series title appears in an inkstick-shaped caption in the corner, each of a different colour.

Hokkoku refers to the northern suburbs of Edo, and is a nickname for the Yoshiwara pleasure quarters. Goshiki-zumi alludes to a haikai poetry anthology of the same name that appeared in 1731; earlier ukiyo-e artists had also used the title in print series, such as Harunobu's Fūryū Goshiki-zumi. (Note: 風流五色墨 Fūryū Goshiki-zumi, "Fashionable Five Shades of Ink") The title also puns on a homonym of -zumi (Note: 住み sumi, "to live", "to dwell"; both words can change from sumi to -zumi when appended to another word.) meaning "to live" or "to dwell"; the title can thus read "Five Varieties of Residents of Yoshiwara".

=== Oiran ===
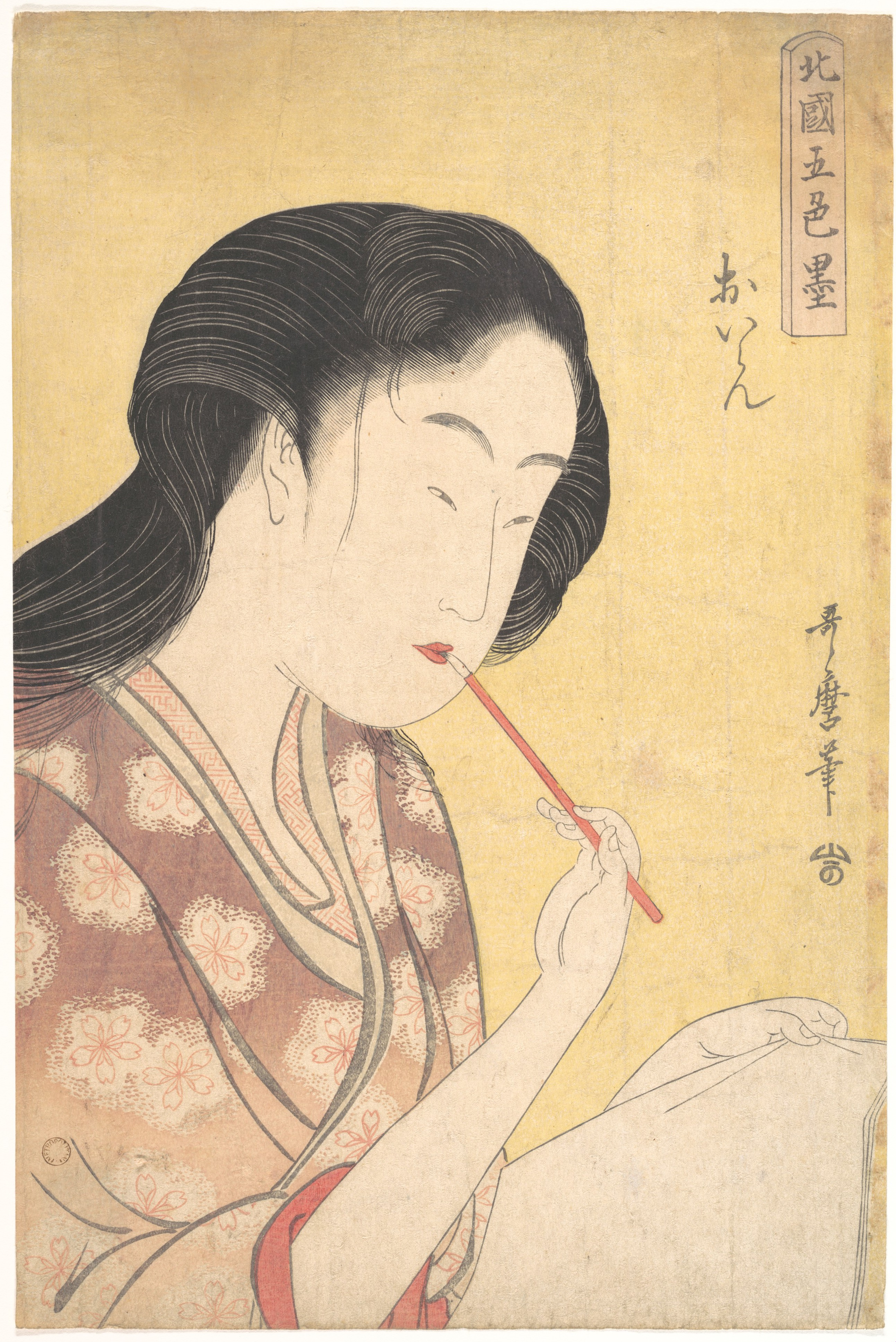

Oiran (おいらん, "high-ranking courtesan") represents the highest-ranking type of prostitute in the pleasure districts. They were not subject to hari-mise (Note: 張見世 hari-mise)—the display of prostitutes for selection behind a grille that lower ranked prostitutes—but rather were called upon for the reception of guests at teahouses, and had their own kamuro (Note: 禿 kamuro) attendants.

This oiran is shown after having her hair washed—an event set for one day per month in Yoshiwara, during which the district was closed. As she waits for her hair to dry, the woman writes a letter, likely to a male customer—such letters were an important part of a courtesan's job to maintain relations.

=== Kiri no Musume ===
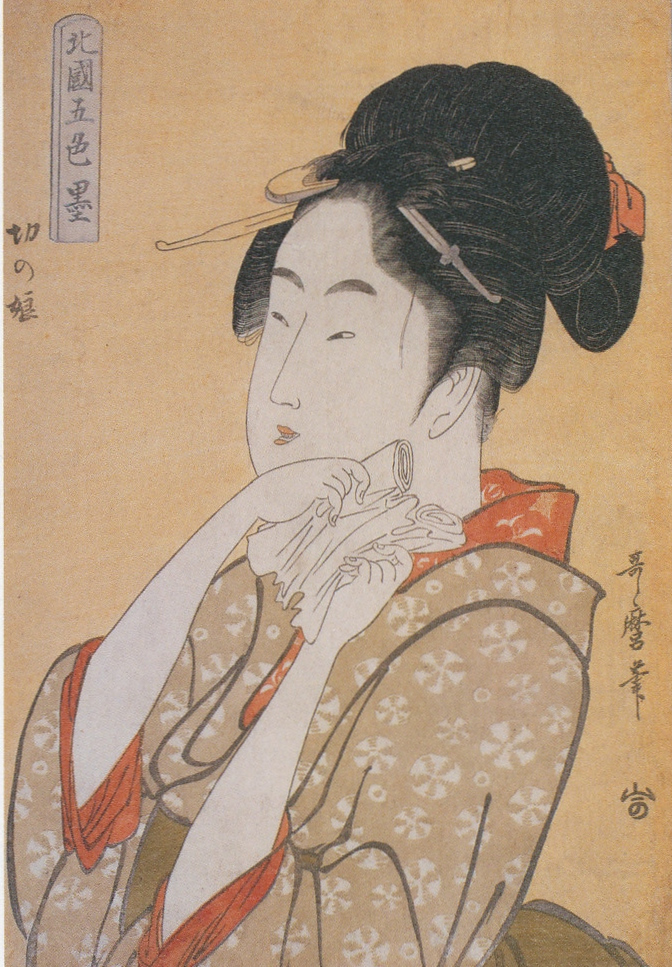

Kiri no Musume (切の娘, "short-term prostitute") was a sort of low-ranked prostitute who worked within the walls of the pleasure districts. Such women lived in kiri-mise (Note: 切見世 kiri-mise) back-alley tenement rowhouses; kiri refers to a span of time, thus such prostitutes charged per length of time.

The kiri no musume has much plainer clothes than the high-ranked oiran, reflecting her lower station, and has a younger, more naïve-looking face. She crumples a letter in her hands with an expression of simple-minded ridicule.

=== Kashi ===
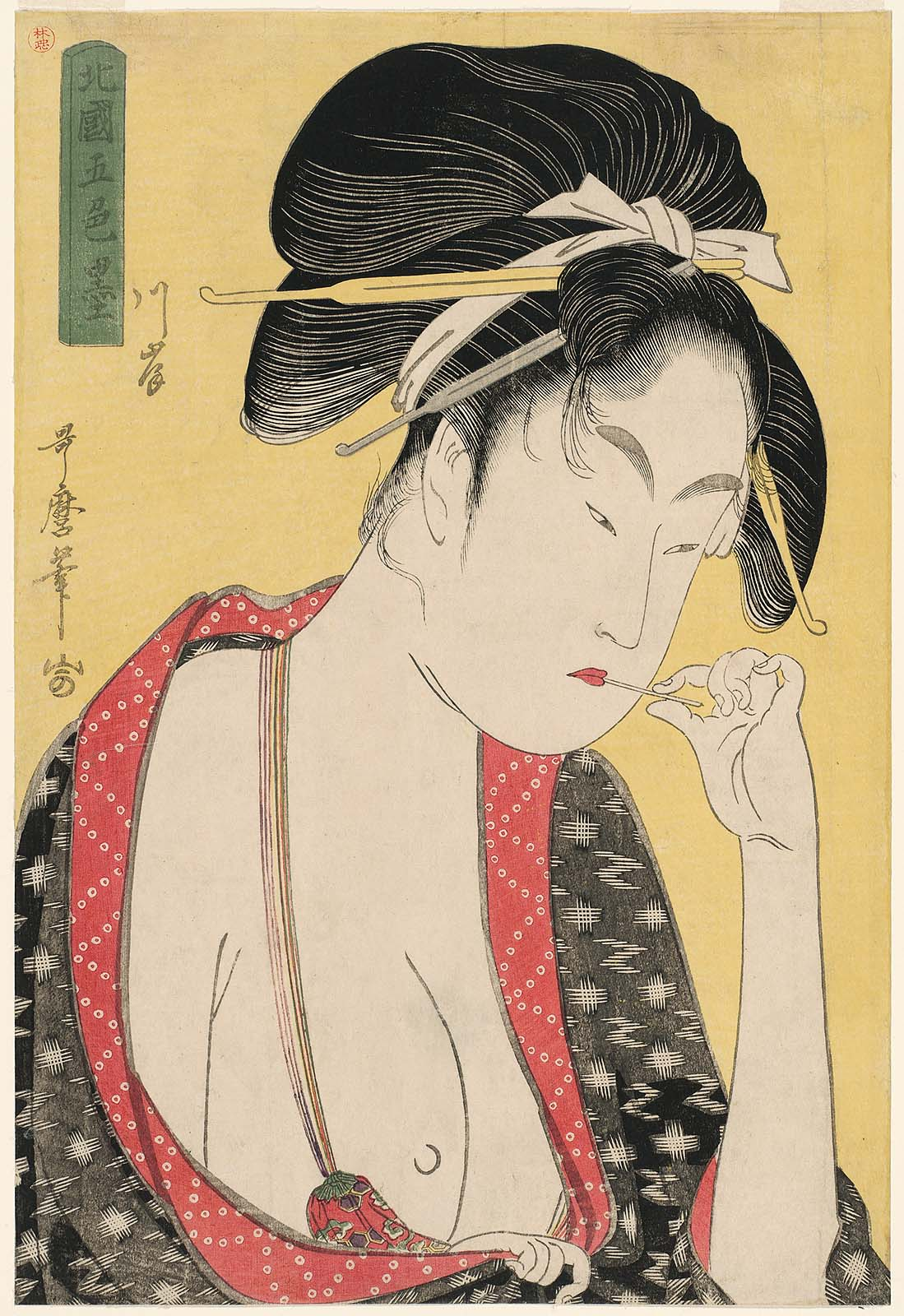

Kashi (川岸 "riverside") most likely refers to the Haguro-dobu (Note: 羽黒溝 Haguro-dobu) moat running outside the main gates of Yoshiwara. A prostitute working there was of the lowest rank, and would not have had the training and refinement of those working within the pleasure district, and served those who could not afford the fees to enter.

The print bears a green cartouche. The woman stands with her shoulders rounded while cleaning her teeth with a toothpick. With shrewd eyes she wears a shameless expression on her round, slightly double-chinned face. Her hair is somewhat out of place, with strands hanging over her face and neck. With her left hand she holds together her black kasuri kimono, which is patterned with geometric shapes and edged with a tie-dyed red collar. Her robes are pulled back, revealing her right shoulder and breast. She carries a red and green perfume pouch with a wisteria-coloured tortoise-shell pattern outlined in yellow.

=== Teppō ===
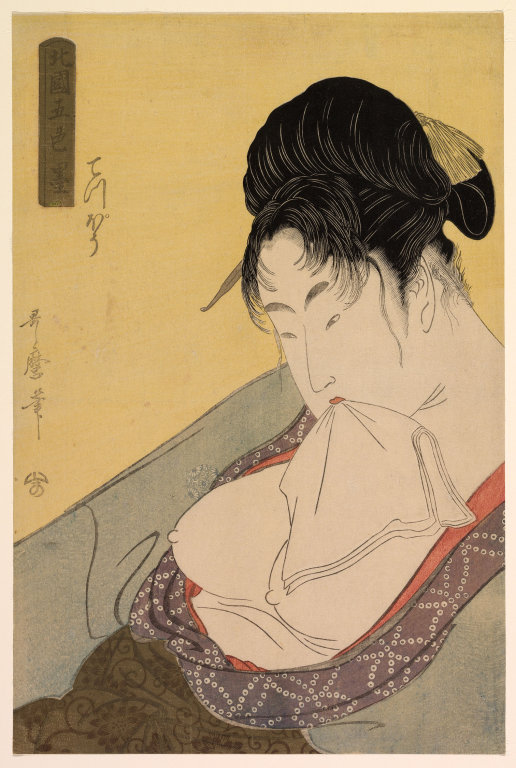

Teppō (てっぽう, "rifle") refers to another type of prostitute who worked outside the walls of Yoshiwara and charged exceptionally low rates. Utamaro depicts her undignified form slumped down in a manner Harold P. Stern likens to Mount Fuji. Those who worked in the low-ranking kiri-mise brothels were prone to contracting fatal syphilis; from this came the contemptuous nicknames teppō-mise (Note: 鉄砲見世 teppō-mise) "rifle shop" and teppō-jorō (Note: 鉄砲女郎 teppō-jorō) "rifle prostitutes".

The woman wears a red-lined light blue kimono pattern with small white chrysanthemums, with a purple collar. Her brownish obi sash bears a more intricate chrysanthemum pattern, and the title cartouche is of the same colour as the obi. The woman's robe is open, revealing her breasts and wrinkled abdomen. Her hair is disheveled and rolled back over the top of her head, held with one hairpin. She holds three sheets of paper between her lips, which was erotically suggestive in artwork of the time. Stern suggests she may be in the midst of the sexual act. Utamaro mercilessly portrays the carnality of the depths of the lives of prostitutes.

=== Geigi ===
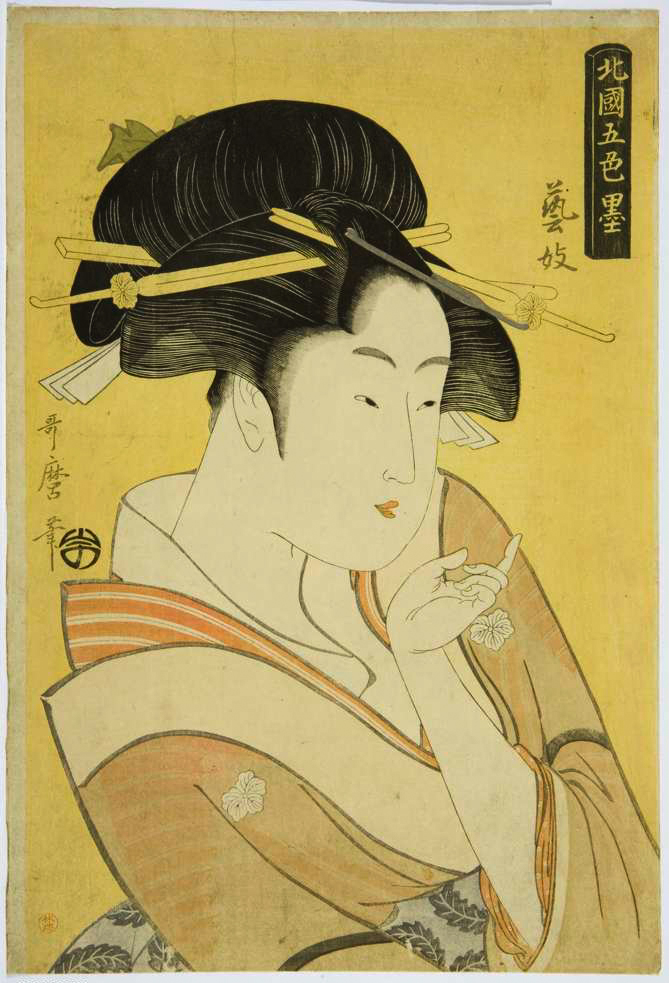

A Geigi (芸妓, another word for "geisha") was the highest-ranked worker in the pleasure districts. Utamaro pictures this one as immaculately groomed. She is decorated with ivy-leaf patterns on her kimono and hairpins, which indicates she likely worked for a house called Tsutaya (tsuta meaning "ivy"). She wears a tan gauze outer robe over a striped salmon-and-white undergarment with a tie-dyed fabric underneath. The stripes of the middle layer can be seen through the translucent outer gauze. Her obi sash bears a leaf pattern against a sparkling mica-dusted background.

The geisha gives a coy smile and poses with her left arm raised at the elbow, pointing the index finger of her left hand, which faces palm up. Her soft, round features contrast with the sharp angles of the collars of her robes.

The print bears a black cartouche. The publisher's seal on this print has a different shape than on the others, and thus is suspected to be the last in the series.
