= Utamaro =

Japanese artist (1753–1806)

Kitagawa Utamaro
- 喜多川 歌麿
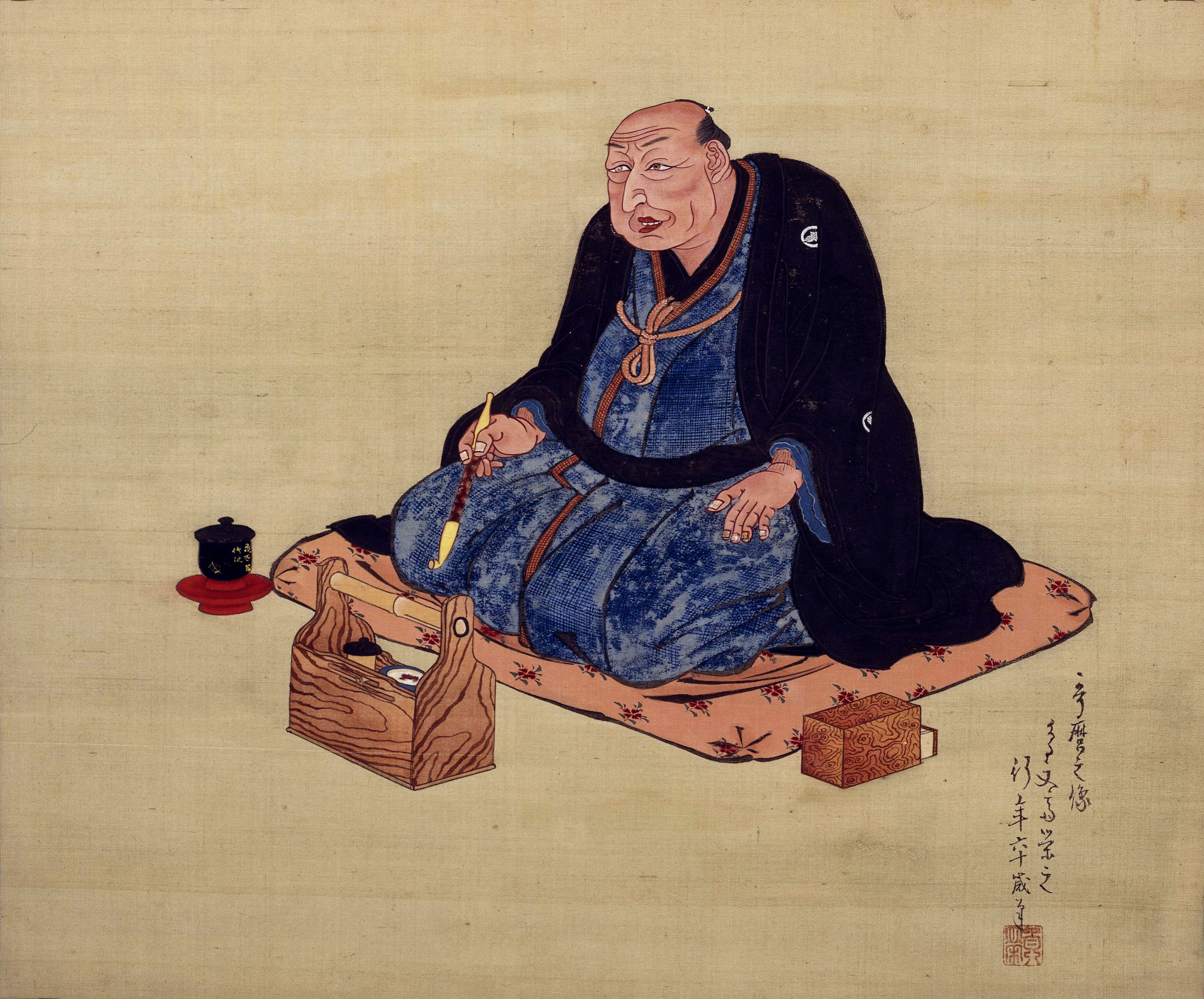
- Portrait by Eishi, 1815
- Born: Kitagawa Ichitarō c. 1753
- Died: 31 October 1806 (aged 52–53); Edo
- Resting place: Senkōji; 35°40′47.09″N 139°35′40.71″E
- Style: Ukiyo-e

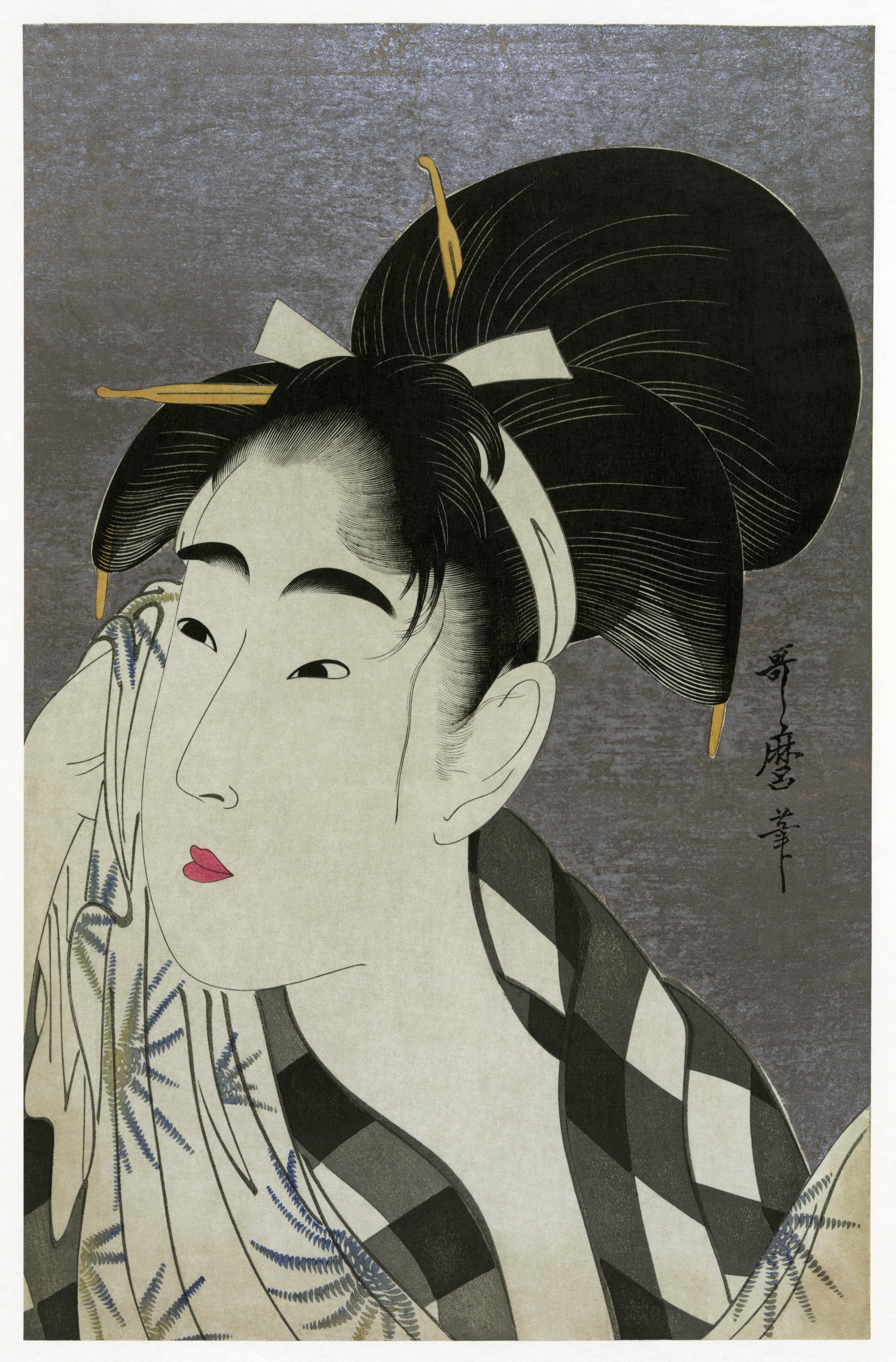
Ase o fuku onna (Woman Wiping Sweat), Ukiyo-e, 1798

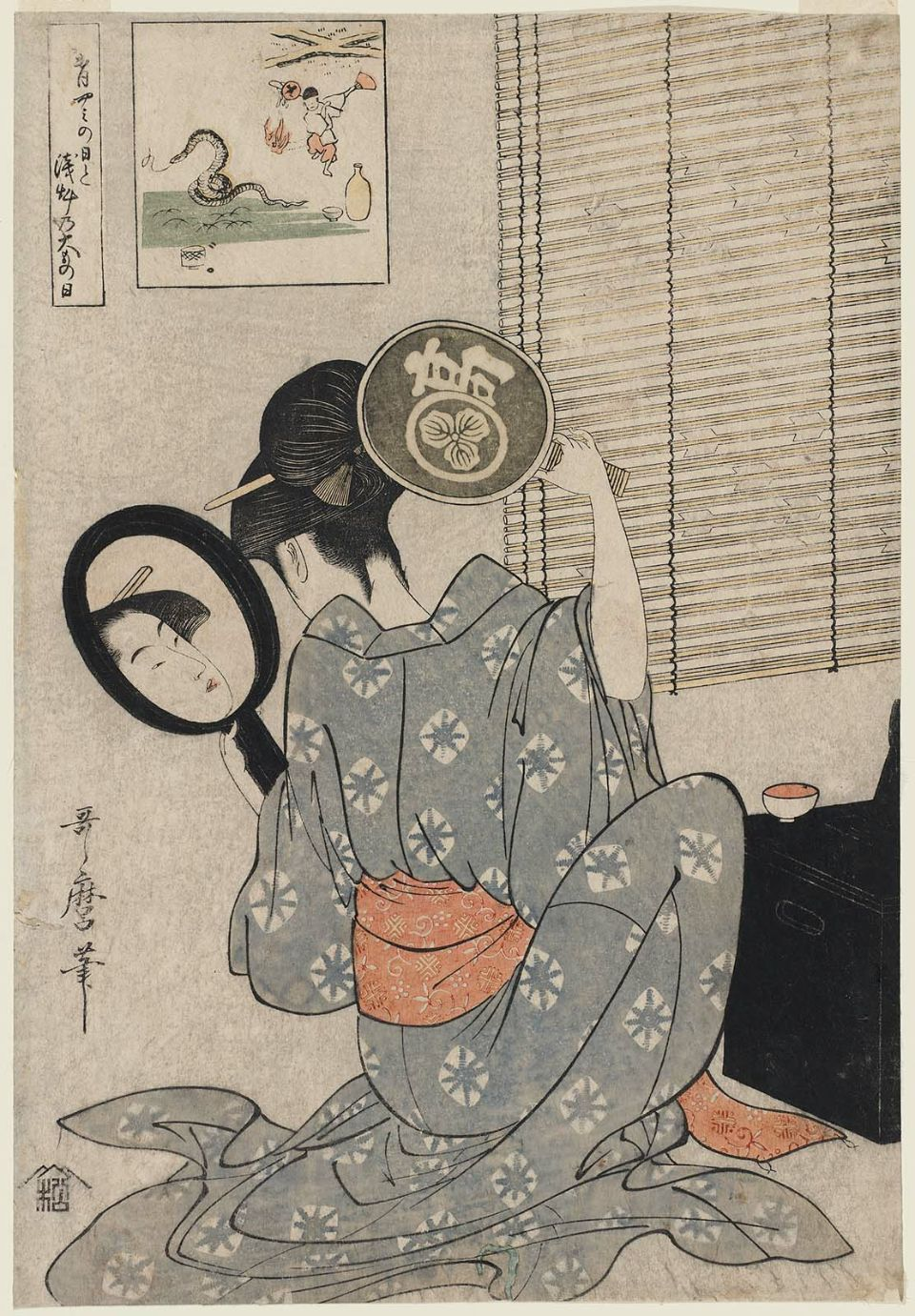
Takashima Ohisa using two mirrors to observe her coiffure

Kitagawa Utamaro (喜多川 歌麿; Japanese pronunciation: [k̟ʲi̥.tä́.ɡä́.β̞ä́ | ɯ̈̀.tä́.mä́.ɾó̞, -β̞ä́ ɯ̈́-, -ŋä́-]; c. 1753 – 31 October 1806) was a Japanese artist. He is one of the most highly regarded designers of ukiyo-e woodblock prints and paintings, and is best known for his bijin ōkubi-e "large-headed pictures of beautiful women" of the 1790s. He also produced nature studies, particularly illustrated books of insects.

Little is known of Utamaro's life. His work began to appear in the 1770s, and he rose to prominence in the early 1790s with his portraits of beauties with exaggerated, elongated features. He produced over 2000 known prints and was one of the few ukiyo-e artists to achieve fame throughout Japan in his lifetime. In 1804 he was arrested and manacled for fifty days for making illegal prints depicting the 16th-century military ruler Toyotomi Hideyoshi, and died two years later.

Utamaro's work reached Europe in the mid-nineteenth century, where it was very popular, enjoying particular acclaim in France. He influenced the European Impressionists, particularly with his use of partial views and his emphasis on light and shade, which they imitated. The reference to the "Japanese influence" among these artists often refers to the work of Utamaro.

== Background ==
Ukiyo-e art flourished in Japan during the Edo period from the seventeenth to nineteenth centuries. The art form took as its primary subjects courtesans, kabuki actors, and others associated with the ukiyo "floating world" lifestyle of the pleasure districts. Alongside paintings, mass-produced woodblock prints were a major form of the genre. Ukiyo-e art was aimed at the common townspeople at the bottom of the social scale, especially of the administrative capital of Edo. Its audience, themes, aesthetics, and mass-produced nature kept it from consideration as serious art.

In the mid-eighteenth century, full-colour nishiki-e prints became common. They were printed by using a large number of woodblocks, one for each colour. Towards the close of the eighteenth century there was a peak in both quality and quantity of the work. Kiyonaga was the pre-eminent portraitist of beauties during the 1780s, and the tall, graceful beauties in his work had a great influence on Utamaro, who was to succeed him in fame. Shunshō of the Katsukawa school introduced the ōkubi-e "large-headed picture" in the 1760s. He and other members of the Katsukawa school, such as Shunkō, popularized the form for yakusha-e actor prints, and popularized the dusting of mica in the backgrounds to produce a glittering effect.

== Biography ==
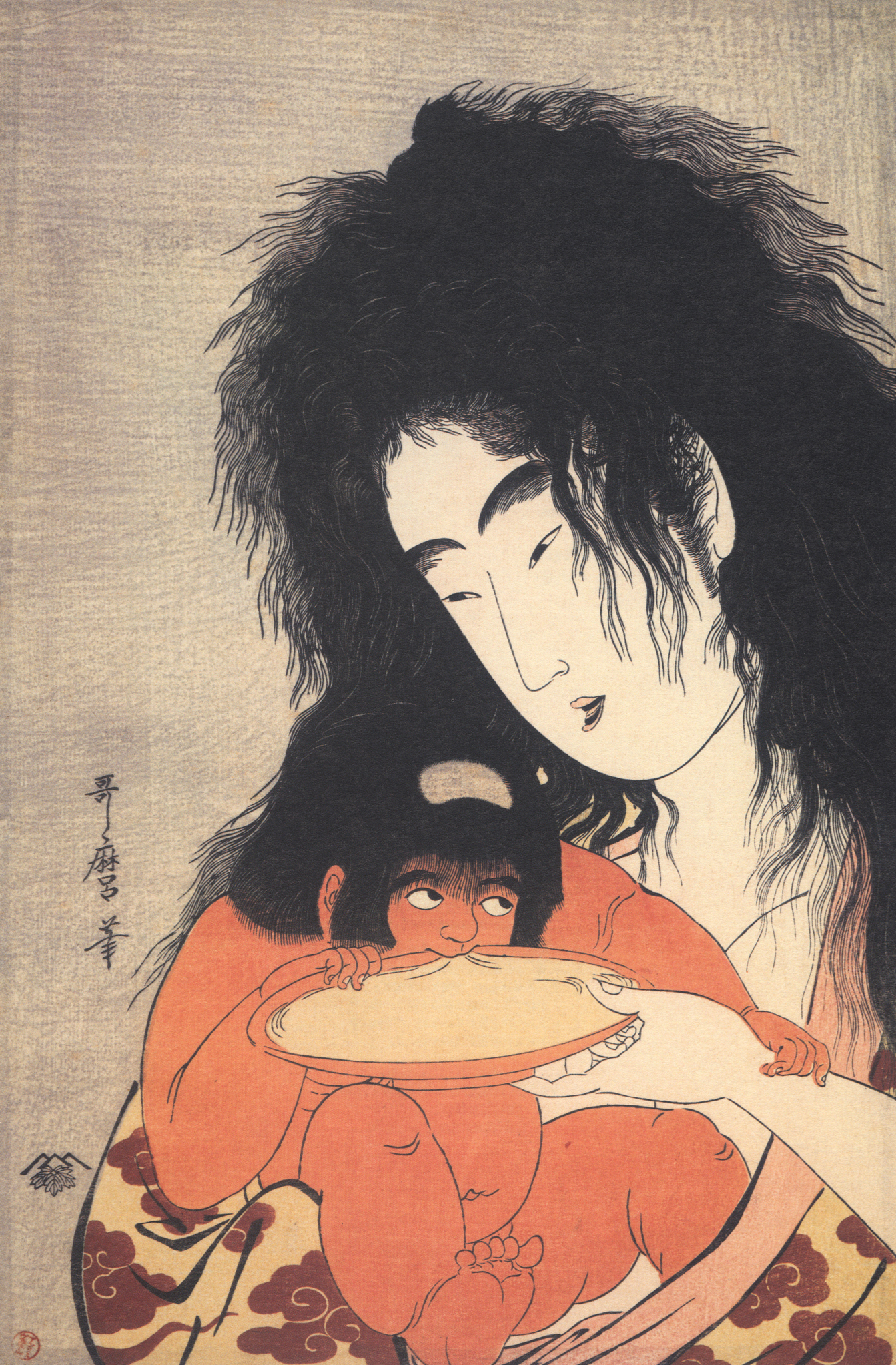
Ukiyo-e of yama-uba with blackened teeth and Kintarō (Yamanba and Kintaro Sakazuki series)

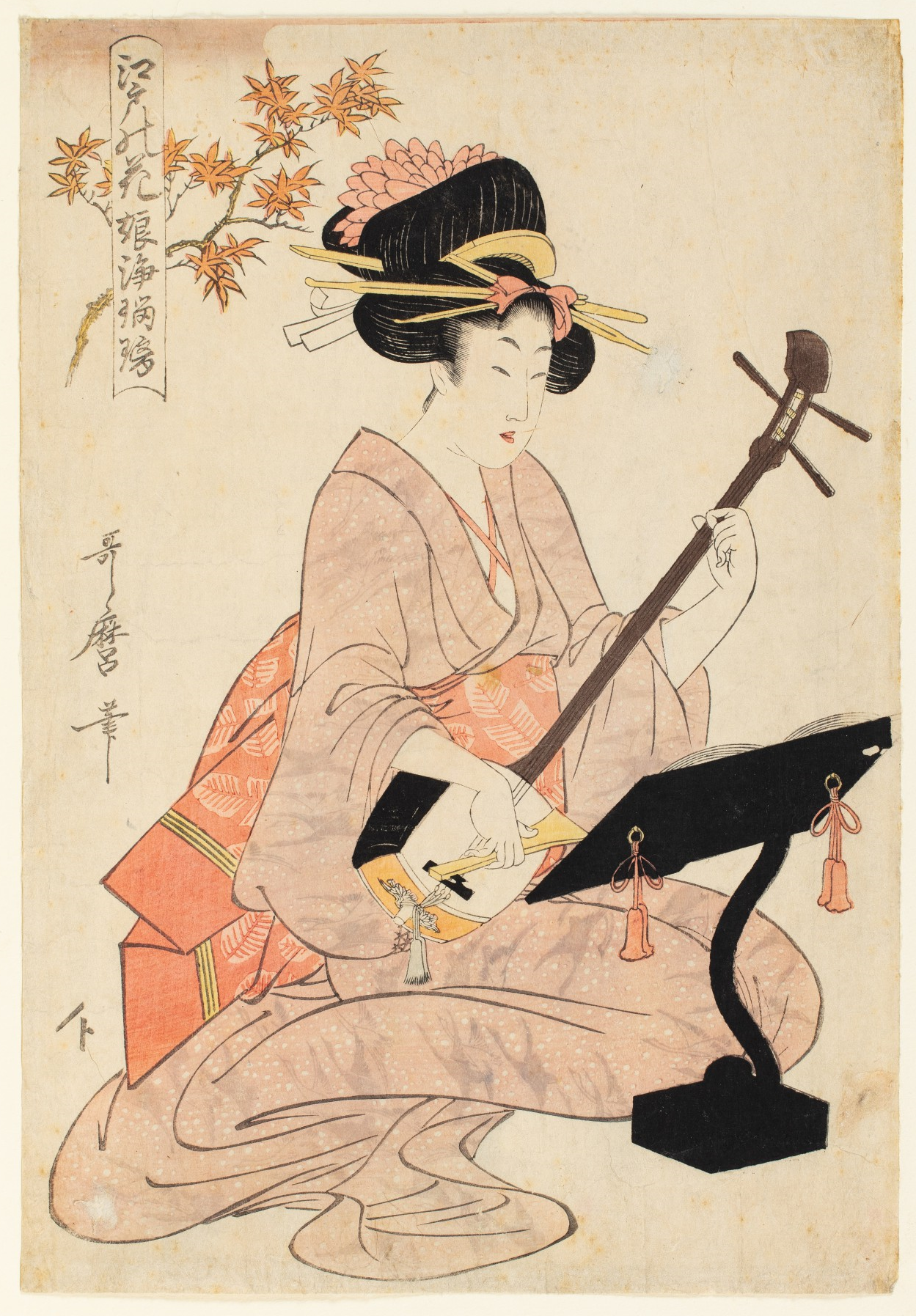
Flowers of Edo: Young Woman's Narrative Chanting to the Shamisen c. 1803

=== Early life ===
Utamaro was born Kitagawa Ichitarō (Note: Kitagawa Ichitarō (北川市太郎); note the spelling 北川 differs from the spelling 喜多川 Utamaro used as an artist.) in c. 1753. As an adult, he was known by the given names Yūsuke, (Note: Yūsuke (勇助)) and later Yūki. (Note: Yūki (勇記)) Early accounts cite his birthplace as Kyoto, Osaka, Yoshiwara in Edo (modern Tokyo), or Kawagoe in Musashi Province (modern Saitama Prefecture); none of these places has been verified. The names of his parents are not known; it has been suggested his father may have been a Yoshiwara teahouse owner, or Toriyama Sekien, an artist who tutored him and who wrote of Utamaro playing in his garden as a child.

Utamaro was married although little is known about his wife and there is no record of their having had children. However, his works include many prints of tender and intimate domestic scenes featuring the same woman and child over several years.

=== Apprenticeship and early work ===
Sometime during his childhood Utamaro came under the tutelage of Sekien, who described his pupil as bright and devoted to art. Sekien, although trained in the upper-class Kanō school of Japanese painting, had become in middle age a practitioner of ukiyo-e and his art was aimed at the townspeople in Edo. His students included haiku poets and ukiyo-e artists such as Eishōsai Chōki.

Utamaro's first published work may be an illustration of eggplants in the haikai poetry anthology Chiyo no Haru (Note: 千代の春 Chiyo no haru, "Eternal Spring") published in 1770. His next known works appear in 1775 under the name Kitagawa Toyoaki, (Note: Kitagawa Toyoaki (北川豊章); "北川豊章" may also read "Toyoakira".)—the cover to a kabuki playbook entitled Forty-eight Famous Love Scenes (Note: Forty-eight Famous Loves Scenes, (四十八手 恋所訳, Shijū Hatte Koi no Showake)) which was distributed at the Edo playhouse Nakamura-za. As Toyoaki, Utamaro continued as an illustrator of popular literature for the rest of the decade, and occasionally produced single-sheet yakusha-e portraits of kabuki actors.

The young publisher Tsutaya Jūzaburō enlisted Utamaro and in the autumn of 1782 the artist hosted a lavish banquet whose list of guests included artists such as Kiyonaga, Kitao Shigemasa, and Katsukawa Shunshō, as well as writers such as Ōta Nanpo (1749–1823)and Hōseidō Kisanji. It was at this banquet that it is believed the artist first announced his new art name, Utamaro. Per custom, he distributed a specially made print for the occasion, in which, before a screen bearing the names of his guests, is a self-portrait of Utamaro making a deep bow.

Utamaro's first work for Tsutaya appeared in a publication dated as 1783: The Fantastic Travels of a Playboy in the Land of Giants, (Note: Migi no Tōri Tashika ni Uso Shikkari Gantori-chō (右通慥而啌多雁取帳)) a kibyōshi picture book created in collaboration with his friend Shimizu Enjū, a writer. (Note: Shimizu Enjū (志水燕十)) In the book, Tsutaya described the pair as making their debuts. (Note: Utamaro and Enjū appeared to have worked on a previous book together during 1781: A Short History of the Sartorial Exploits of a Great Connoisseur of Inari Machi (身貌大通神略縁起, Minari Daitsūjin Ryakuengi), which Utamaro signed as "Utamaro, Dilettante of Shinobugaoka". Kiyoshi Shibui suggests the publication of the work may have been delayed.)

At some point in the mid-1780s, probably 1783, he went to live with Tsutaya Jūzaburō. It is estimated that he lived there for approximately five years. He seems to have become a principal artist for the Tsutaya firm. Evidence of his prints for the next few years is sporadic, as he mostly produced illustrations for books of kyōka ("crazy verse"), a parody of the classical waka form. None of his work produced during the period 1790–1792 has survived.

=== Height of fame ===
In about 1791 Utamaro gave up designing prints for books and concentrated on making single portraits of women displayed in half-length, rather than the prints of women in groups favoured by other ukiyo-e artists.

In 1793 he achieved recognition as an artist, and his semi-exclusive arrangement with the publisher Tsutaya Jūzaburō ended. Utamaro then went on to produce several series of well-known works, all featuring women of the Yoshiwara district.

Over the years, he also created a number of volumes of animal, insect, and nature studies and shunga, or erotica. Shunga prints were quite acceptable in Japanese culture, not associated with a negative concept of pornography as found in western cultures, but considered rather as a natural aspect of human behavior and circulated among all levels of Japanese society.

=== Later life ===
Tsutaya Jūzaburō died in 1797, and Utamaro thereafter lived in Kyūemon-chō, then Bakuro-chō, and finally near the Benkei Bridge. Utamaro was apparently very upset by the loss of his long-time friend and supporter. Some commentators feel that after this event, his work never reached the heights previously attained.

A law went into effect in 1790 requiring prints to bear a censor's seal of approval to be sold. Censorship increased in strictness over the following decades, and violators could receive harsh punishments. From 1799 even preliminary drafts required approval. A group of Utagawa-school offenders including Toyokuni had their works repressed in 1801. In 1804, Utamaro ran into legal trouble over a series of prints of samurai warriors, with their names slightly disguised; the depiction of warriors, their names, and their crests was forbidden at the time. Records have not survived of what sort of punishment Utamaro received.

==== Arrest of 1804 ====
The Ehon Taikōki, (Note: 絵本太閤記 Ehon Taikōki, "Illustrated Chronicles of the Regent"; seven parts in eighty-four volumes; text by Takeuchi Kakusai, based on an early Taikōki by Ose Hoan; illustrations by Okada Gyokuzan) published from 1797 to 1802, detailed the life of the 16th-century military ruler, Toyotomi Hideyoshi. The work was widely adapted, such as for kabuki and bunraku theatre. When artists and writers put out prints and books based on the Ehon Taikōki in the disparaged ukiyo-e style, it attracted reprisals from the government. In probably the most famous case of censorship of the Edo period, Utamaro was imprisoned in 1804, (Note: 23 June 1804, according to Ōta Nanpo's diary) after which he was manacled along with Tsukimaro, Toyokuni, Shuntei, Shun'ei, and Jippensha Ikku for fifty days and their publishers subjected to heavy fines.

Government documents of the case are no longer extant, and there are few other documents relating to the incident. It appears that Utamaro was most prominent of the group. The artists might have offended the authorities by identifying the historical figures by name and with their identifying crests and other symbols, which was prohibited, and by depicting Hideyoshi with prostitutes (Note: 遊女 yūjo) of the pleasure quarters. Utamaro's censored prints include one of the daimyō Katō Kiyomasa lustily gazing at a Korean dancer at a party, another of Hideyoshi holding the hand of his page Ishida Mitsunari in a sexually suggestive manner, and another of Hideyoshi with his five consorts viewing the cherry blossoms at the temple Daigo-ji in Kyoto, a historical event famous for displaying Hideyoshi's extravagance. This last displays the names of each consort while placing them in the typical poses of courtesans at a Yoshiwara party.

Utamaro prints censored in 1804

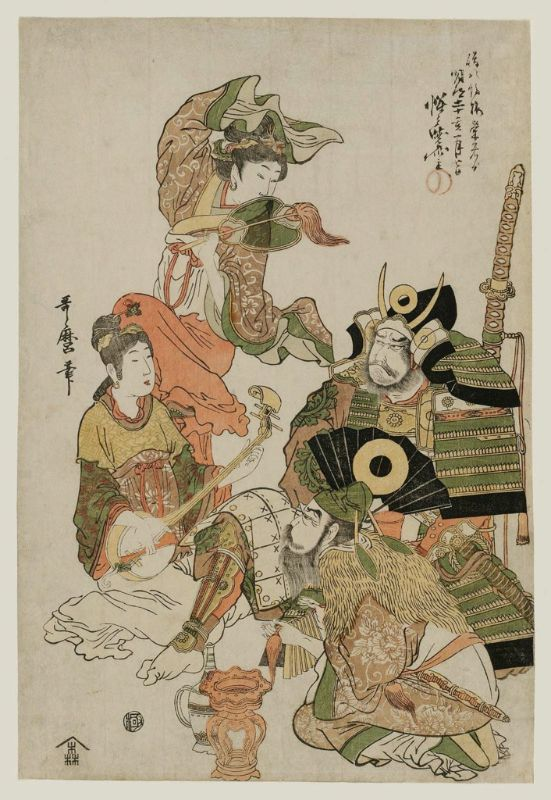
Katō Kiyomasa at a party with Korean dancers

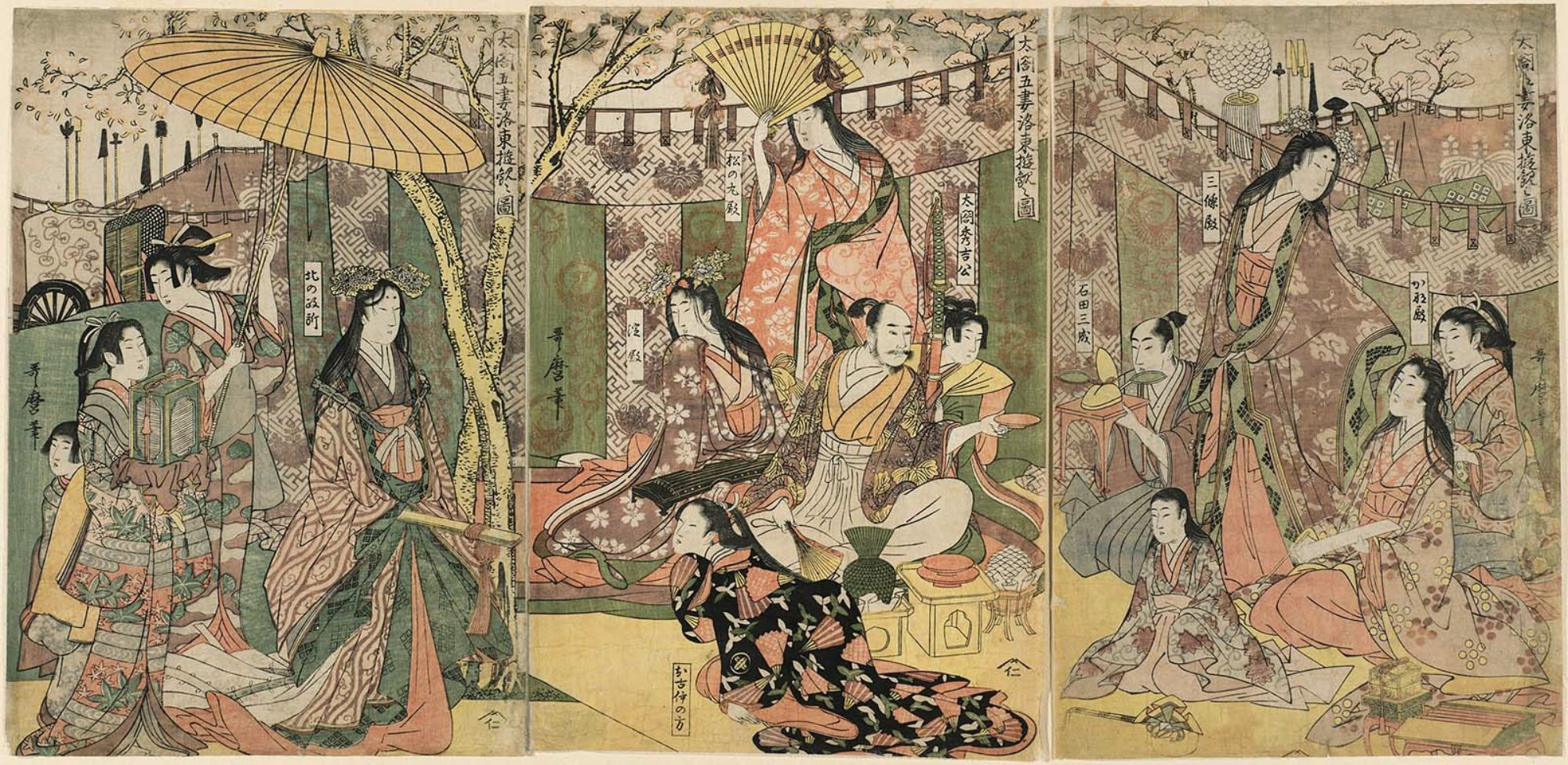
Hideyoshi and his Five Wives Viewing the Cherry-blossoms at Higashiyama

=== Death ===
Records give Utamaro's death date as the 20th day of the 9th month of the year Bunka, which equates to 31 October 1806. He was given the Buddhist posthumous name Shōen Ryōkō Shinshi. (Note: Shōen Ryōkō Shinshi (秋円了教信士)) Apparently with no heirs, his tomb at the temple Senkōji was left untended. A century later, in 1917, admirers of Utamaro had the decayed grave repaired.

== Pupils ==
Utamaro had a number of pupils, who took names such as Kikumaro (later Tsukimaro), Hidemaro, and Takemaro. These artists produced works in the master's style, though none are considered of Utamaro's quality. Sometimes he allowed them to sign his name. Of his students, Koikawa Shunchō married Utamaro's widow on the master's death and took on the name Utamaro II. After 1820 he produced his work under the name Kitagawa Tetsugorō.

== Analysis ==
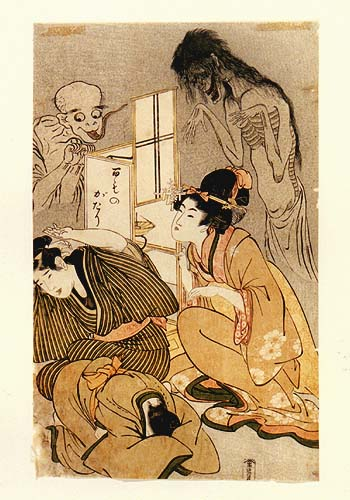
One Hundred Stories of Demons and Spirits

[Utamaro] created an absolutely new type of female beauty. At first he was content to draw the head in normal proportions and quite definitely round in shape; only the neck on which this head was posed was already notably slender ... Towards the middle of the tenth decade these exaggerated proportions of the body had reached such an extreme that the heads were twice as long as they were broad, set upon slim long necks, which in turn swayed upon very slim shoulders; the upper coiffure bulged out to such a degree that it almost surpassed the head itself in extent; the eyes were indicated by short slits, and were separated by an inordinately long nose from an infinitesimally small mouth; the soft robes hung loosely about figures of an almost unearthly thinness.

— Woldemar von Seidlitz, Geschichte des japanischen Farbenholzschnittes, 1897

What little information about Utamaro's life that has been passed down is often contradictory, so analysis of his development as an artist relies chiefly on his work itself. Utamaro is known primarily for his bijin-ga portraits of female beauties, though his work ranges from kachō-e "flower-and-bird pictures" to landscapes to book illustrations.

Utamaro's early bijin-ga follow closely the example of Kiyonaga. In the 1790s his figures became more exaggerated, with thin bodies and long faces with small features. Utamaro experimented with line, colour, and printing techniques to bring out subtle differences in the features, expressions, and backdrops of subjects from a wide variety of class and background. Utamaro's individuated beauties were in sharp contrast to the stereotyped, idealized images that had been the norm.

By the end of the 1790s, especially following the death of his patron Tsutaya Jūzaburō in 1797, Utamaro's prodigious output declined in quality. By 1800 his exaggerations had become more extreme, with faces three times as long as they are wide and body proportions of eight heads length to the body. By this point, critics such as Basil Stewart consider Utamaro's figures to "lose much of their grace.

Utamaro produced more than two thousand prints during his working career, amongst which are over 120 bijin-ga print series. He made illustrations for nearly 100 books and about 30 paintings. He also created a number of paintings and surimono, as well as many illustrated books, including more than thirty shunga books, albums, and related publications. Among his best-known works are the series Ten Studies in Female Physiognomy, A Collection of Reigning Beauties, Great Love Themes of Classical Poetry (sometimes called Women in Love containing individual prints such as Revealed Love and Pensive Love), and Twelve Hours in the Pleasure Quarters. His work appeared from at least 60 publishers, of which Tsutaya Jūzaburō and Izumiya Ichibei were the most important.

He alone, of his contemporary ukiyo-e artists, achieved a national reputation during his lifetime. His paintings are generally considered the finest and most evocative bijin-ga in all of ukiyo-e.

He succeeded in capturing the subtle aspects of personality and the transient moods of women of all classes, ages, and circumstances. His reputation has remained undiminished since. Kitagawa Utamaro's work is known worldwide, and he generally is regarded as one of the half-dozen greatest ukiyo-e artists of all time.

== Legacy ==
Utamaro was recognized as a master in his own age. He appears to have achieved a national reputation at a time when even the most popular Edo ukiyo-e artists were little known outside the city. Due to his popularity Utamaro had many imitators, some of whom likely signed their work with his name; this is believed to include students of his and his successor, Utamaro II. On rare occasions Utamaro signed his work "the genuine Utamaro" (Note: 正銘歌麿 Shōmei Utamaro) to distinguish himself from these imitators. Forgeries and reprints of Utamaro's work are common; he produced a large body of work, but his earlier, more popular works are difficult to find in good condition.

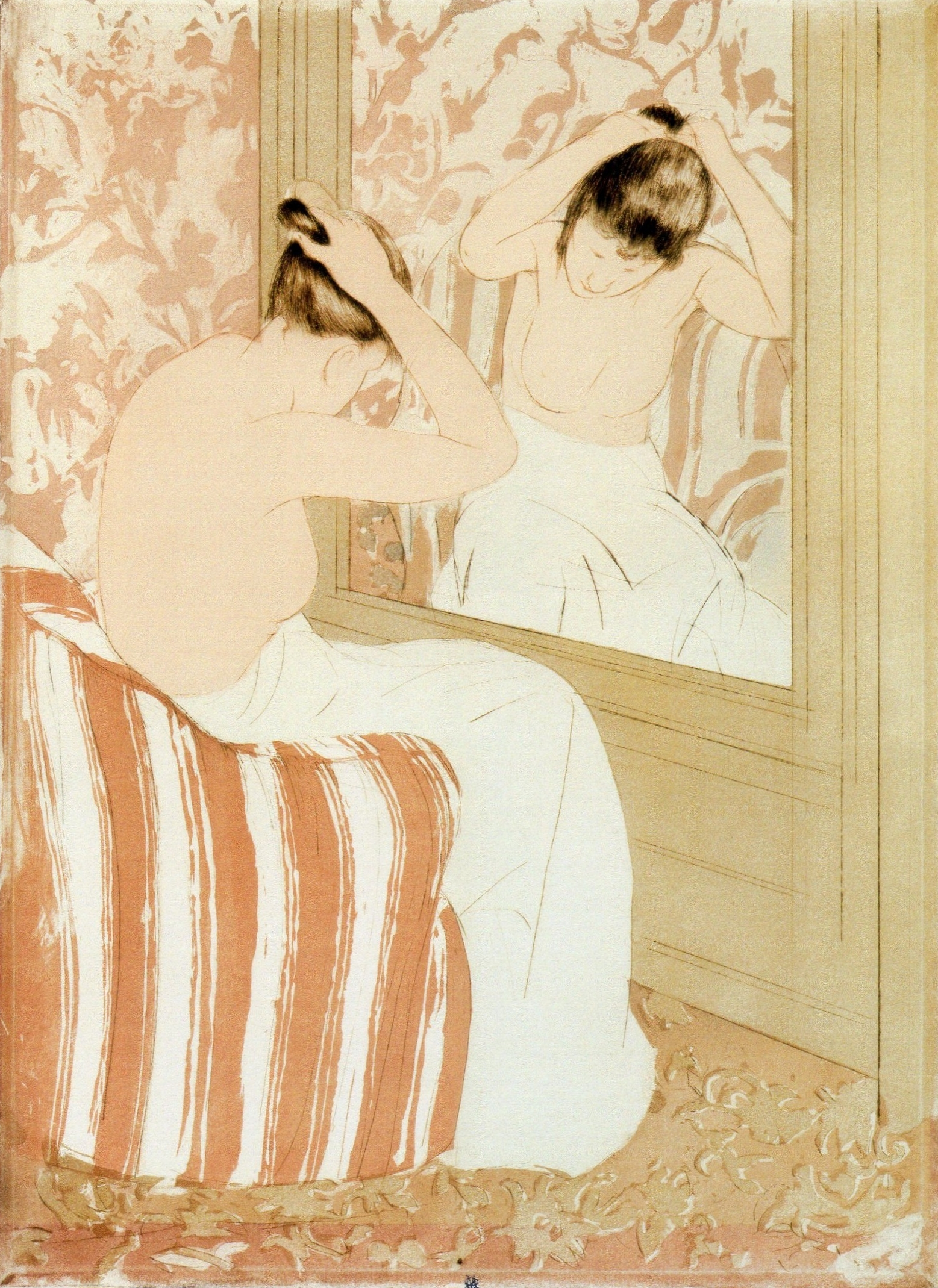
Utamaro had a profound influence on French Impressionists such as Mary Cassatt. The Coiffure, drypoint and aquatint, c. 1890–91

A wave of interest in Japanese art swept France from the mid-19th century, called Japonisme. Exhibitions in Paris of Japanese art began to be staged in the 1880s, include an Utamaro exhibition in 1888 by the German-French art dealer Siegfried Bing. The French Impressionists regarded Utamaro's work on a level akin with Hokusai and Hiroshige. French artist-collectors of Utamaro's work included Monet, Degas, Gauguin, and Toulouse-Lautrec

Utamaro's prints also formed part of the collection assembled by the French financier Isaac de Camondo, whose bequest to the Louvre, later enriched by further donations, became the basis of the substantial Utamaro holdings at the Musée Guimet in Paris. It has also been argued that the Austrian Symbolist painter Gustav Klimt was specifically influenced in his art by Utamaro.

Utamaro had an influence on the compositional, colour, and sense of tranquility of the American painter Mary Cassatt's work. The shin-hanga ("new prints") artist Goyō Hashiguchi (1880–1921) was called the "Utamaro of the Taishō period" (1912–1926) for his manner of depicting women. The painter character Seiji Moriyama in the British novelist Kazuo Ishiguro's An Artist of the Floating World (1986) has a reputation as a "modern Utamaro" for his combination of Western techniques and Utamaro-like feminine subjects.

In 2016 Utamaro's Fukaku Shinobu Koi set the record price for an ukiyo-e print sold at auction at €745000.

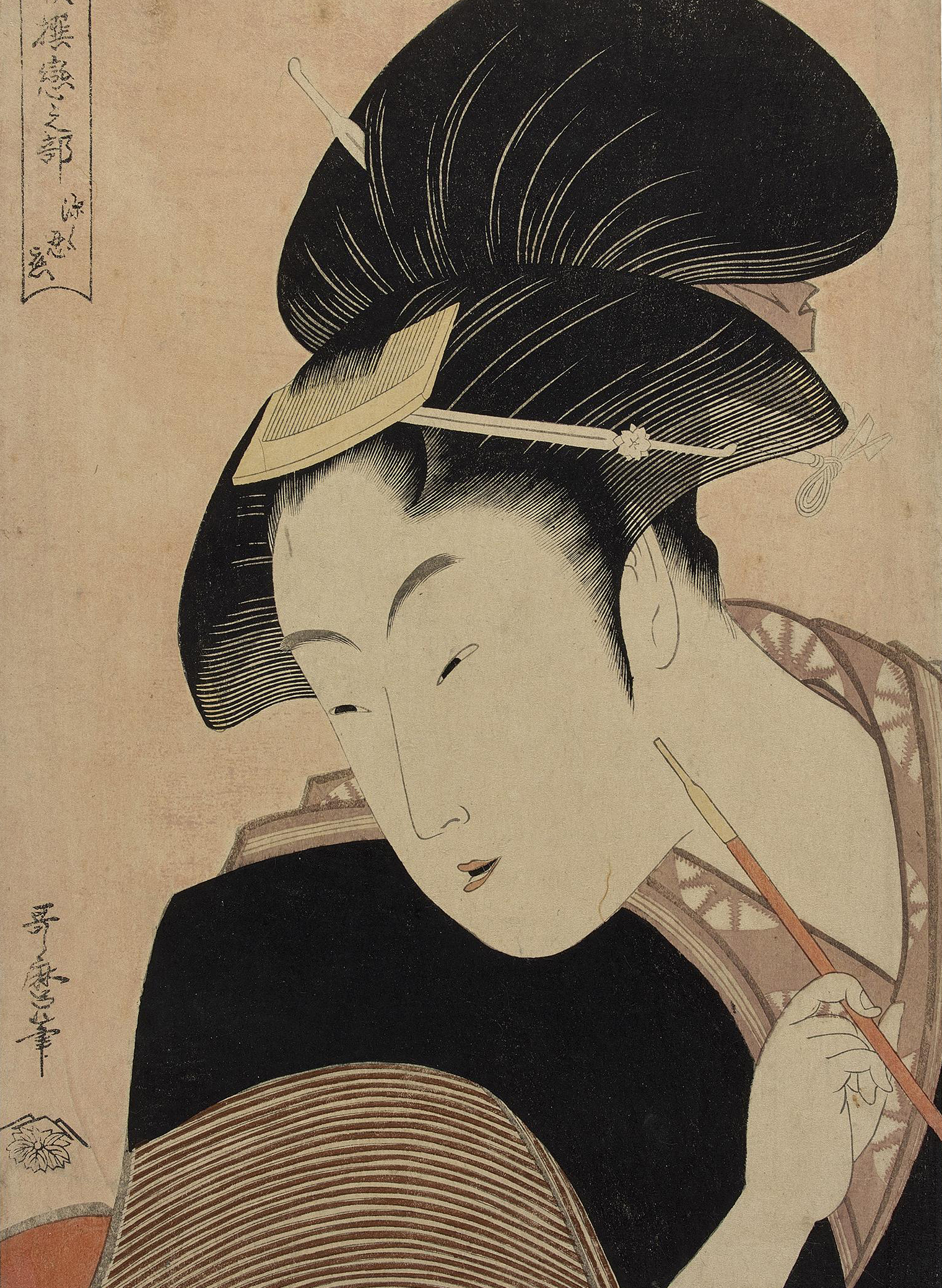
Utamaro's Fukaku Shinobu Koi (c. 1793–94) set an auction record of €745000 in 2016.

The 2016 role-playing game Persona 5 has a character named Yusuke Kitagawa after Utamaro's surname.

== Historiography ==
The only surviving official record of Utamaro is a stele at Senkō-ji Temple, which gives his death date as the 20th day of the 9th month of the year Bunka, which equates to 31 October 1806. The record states he was 54 by East Asian age reckoning, by which age begins at 1 rather than 0. From this a birth year of c. 1753 is deduced.

Utamaro has gained general acceptance as one of the form's greatest masters. The earliest document of ukiyo-e artists, Ukiyo-e Ruikō, was first compiled while Utamaro was active. The work was not printed, but exists in various manuscripts that different writers altered and expanded. The earliest surviving copy, the Ukiyo-e Kōshō, wrote of Utamaro:

Kitagawa Utamaro, personal name Yūsuke
At the start entered the studio of Toriyama Sekien and studied pictures in the Kanō school. Later drew pictures of the styles and manners of men and women and resided temporarily with ezōshiya Tsutaya Jūzaburō. Now lives in Benkeibashi. Many nishiki-e.

The earliest comprehensive historical and critical works on ukiyo-e came from the West, and often denied Utamaro a place in the ukiyo-e canon. Ernest Fenollosa's Masters of Ukioye of 1896 was the first such overview of ukiyo-e. The book posited ukiyo-e as having evolved towards a late-18th-century golden age that began to decline with the advent of Utamaro, which he condemned for his "gradual elongation of the figure, and an adoption of violent emotion and extravagant attitudes". Fenollosa had harsher criticism for Utamaro's pupils, who he considered to have "carried the extravagances of their teacher to a point of ugliness". In his Chats on Japanese Prints of 1915, Arthur Davison Ficke concurred that with Utamaro ukiyo-e entered a period of exaggerated, manneristic decadence.

Laurence Binyon, the Keeper of Oriental Prints and Drawings at the British Museum, wrote an account in Painting in the Far East in 1908 that was similar to Fenollosa's, considering the 1790s a period of decline, but placing Utamaro amongst the masters. He called Utamaro "one of the world's artists for the intrinsic qualities of his genius" and "the greatest of all the figure-designers" in ukiyo-e, with a "far greater resource of composition" than his peers and an "endless" capacity for "unexpected invention". James A. Michener re-evaluated the development of ukiyo-e in The Floating World of 1954, in which he places the 1790s as "the culminating years of ukiyo-e", when "Utamaro brought the grace of Sukenobu to its apex". Seiichirō Takahashi's Traditional Woodblock Prints of Japan of 1964 set the golden age of ukiyo-e at the period of Kiyonaga, Utamaro, and Sharaku, followed by a period of decline with the declaration beginning in the 1790s of strict sumptuary laws that dictated what could be depicted in artworks.

The French art critic Edmond de Goncourt published Outamaro, the first monograph on Utamaro, in 1891, with help from the Japanese art dealer Tadamasa Hayashi. British ukiyo-e scholar Jack Hillier had the monograph Utamaro: Colour Prints and Paintings published in 1961.

== Print series ==
A partial list of his print series and their dates includes:

- Utamakura (1788) attributed
- Chosen Poems (1791–1792)
- Ten Types of Women's Physiognomies (1792–1793)
- Famous Beauties of Edo (1792–1793)
- Ten Learned Studies of Women (1792–1793)
- Anthology of Poems: The Love Section (1793–1794)
- Snow, Moon, and Flowers of the Green Houses (1793–1795)
- Five Shades of Ink in the Northern Quarter (1794–1795)
- Array of Supreme Beauties of the Present Day (1794)
- Twelve Hours of the Green Houses (1794–1795)
- Renowned Beauties from the Six Best Houses (1795–96)
- Flourishing Beauties of the Present Day (1795–1797)
- An Array of Passionate Lovers (1797–1798)
- Ten Forms of Feminine Physiognomy (1802)

== Paintings ==
- Shinagawa no Tsuki, Yoshiwara no Hana, and Fukagawa no Yuki

== Gallery ==
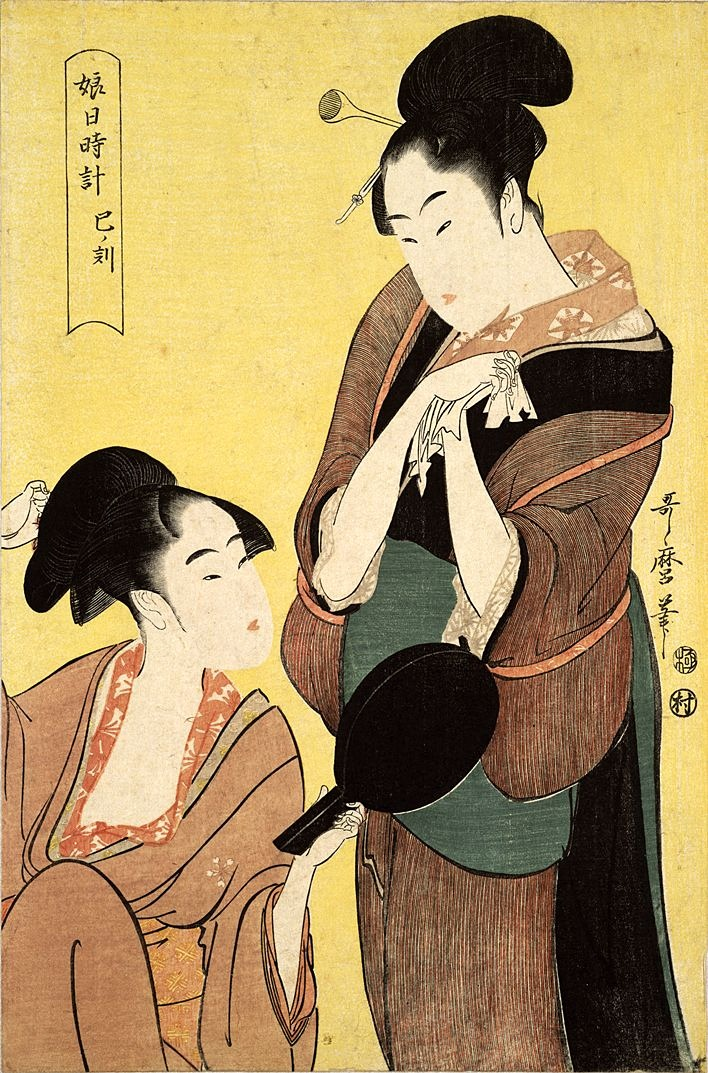
Women playing with the mirror, 1797

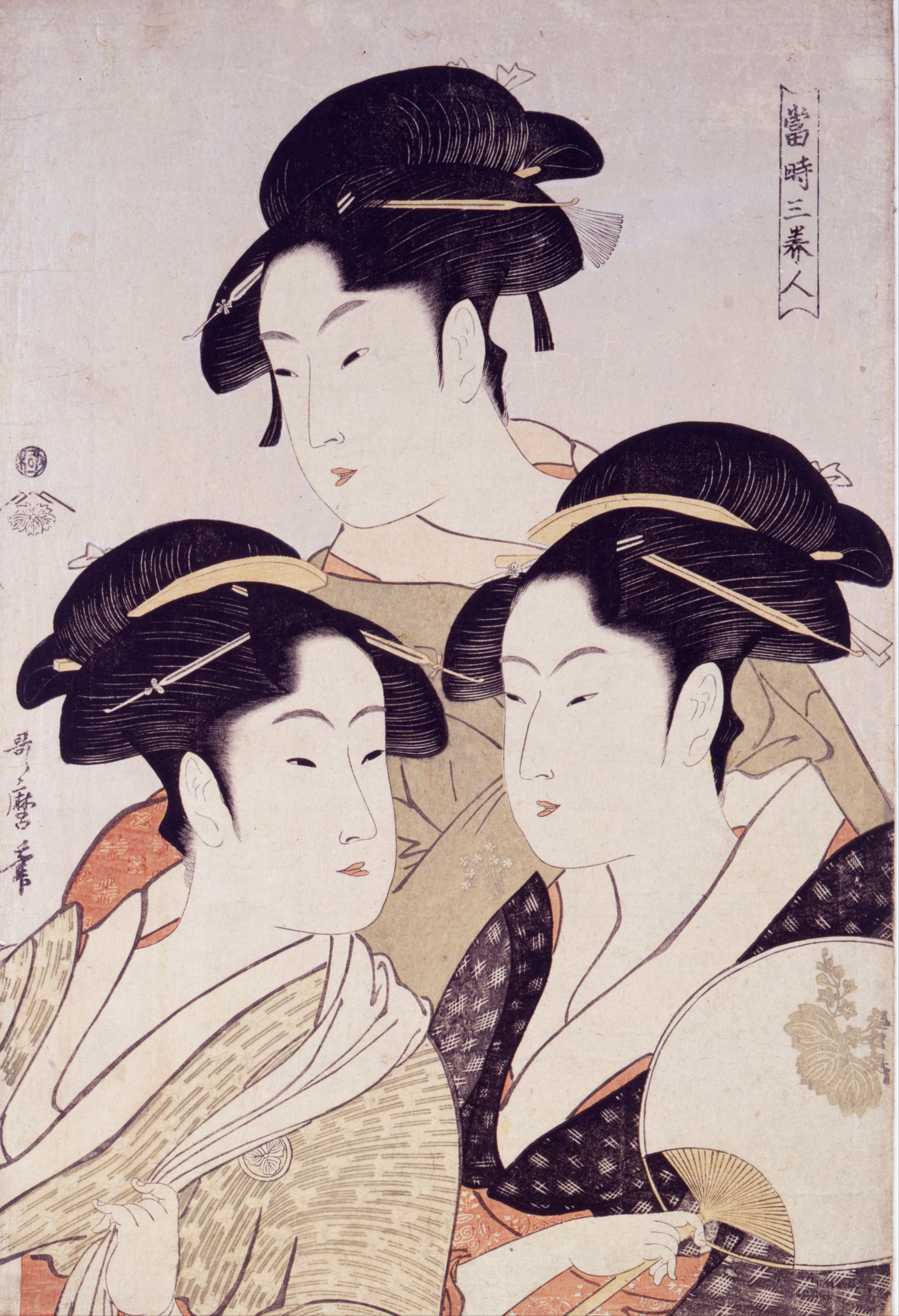
Three Beauties of the Present Day c. 1793

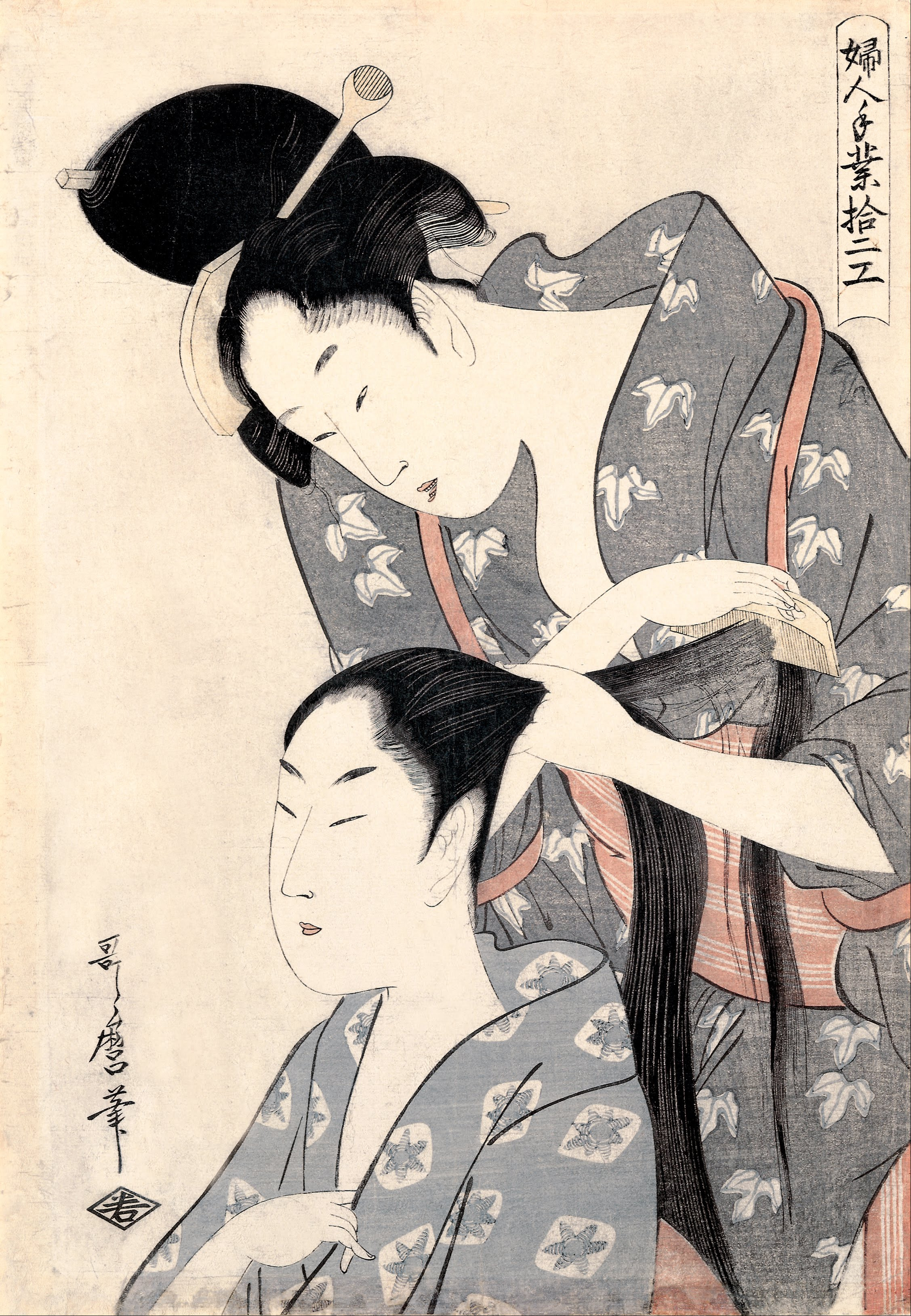
Hairdresser from the series Twelve types of women's handicraft

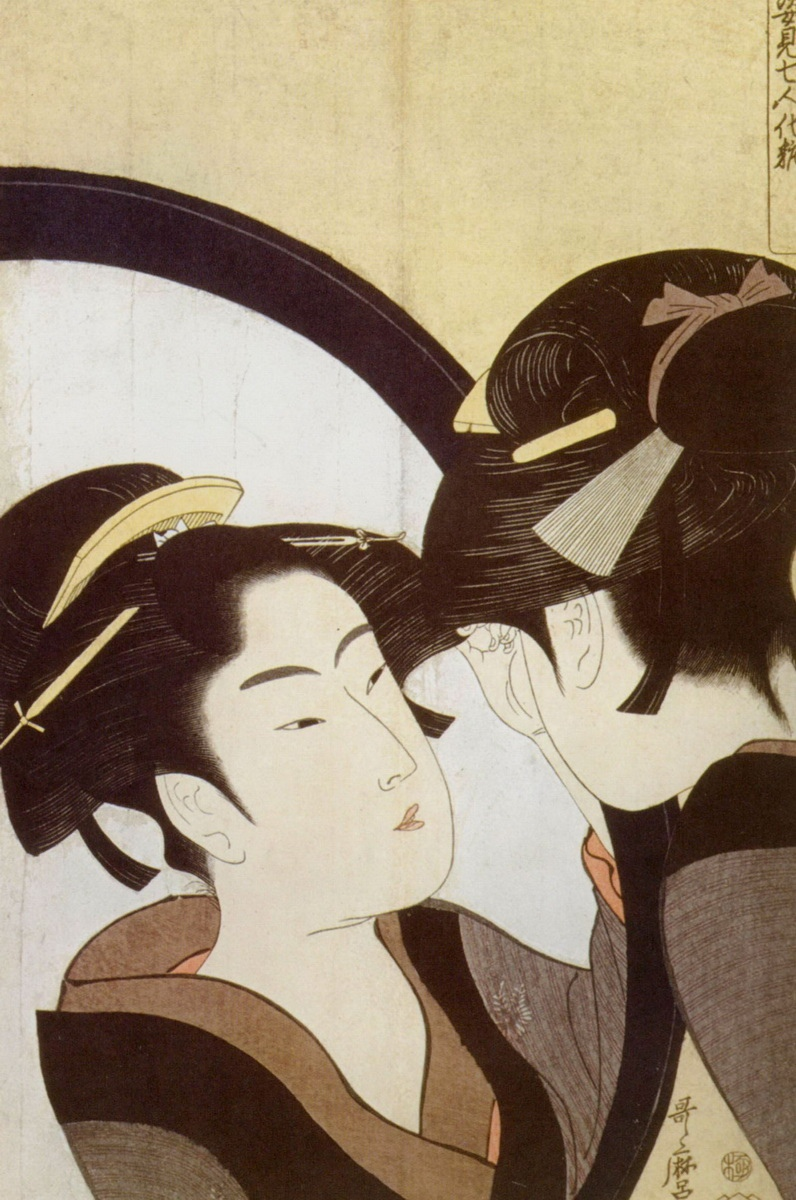
Sugatami Shichinin Keshō

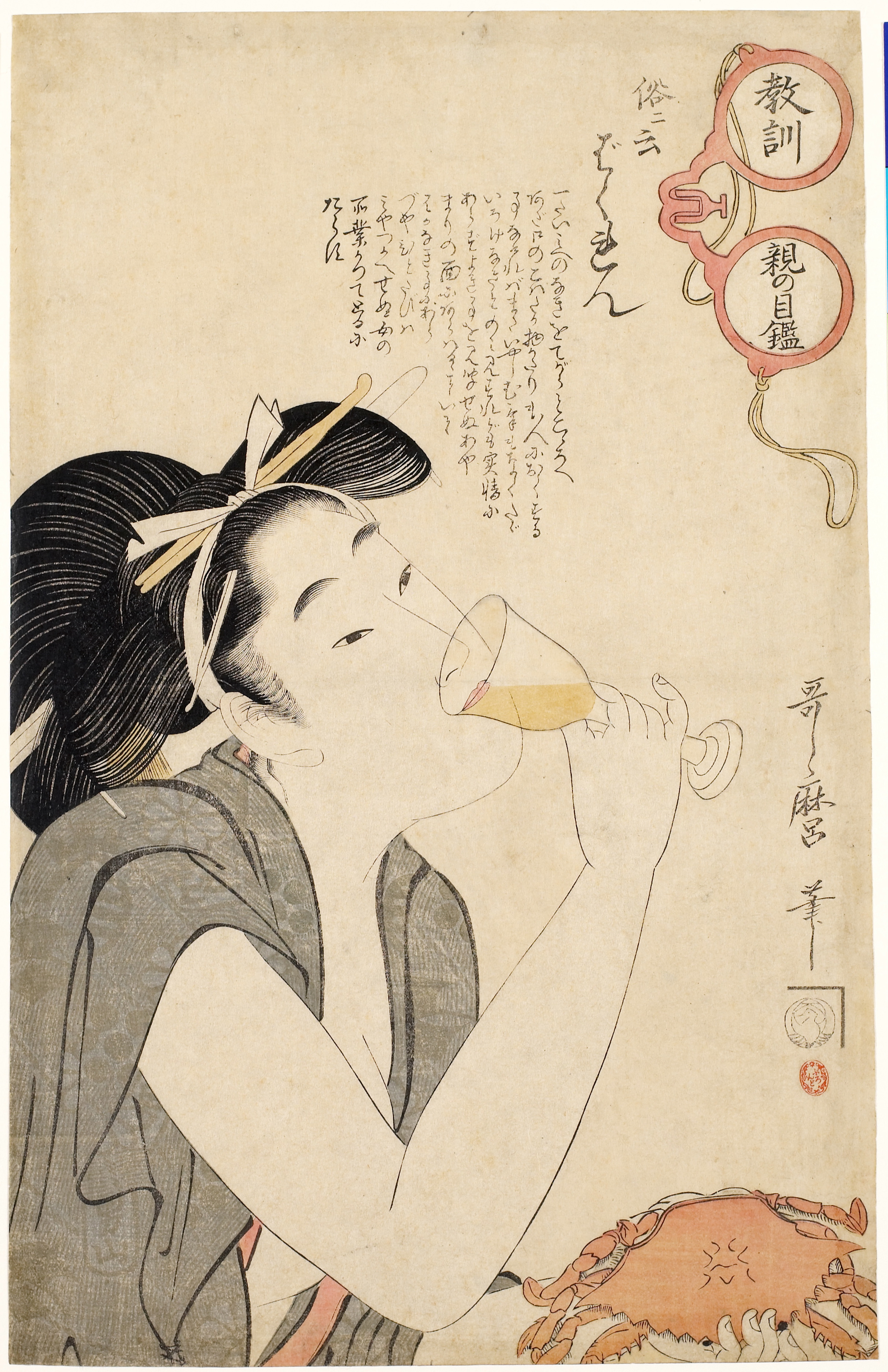
Woman drinking wine

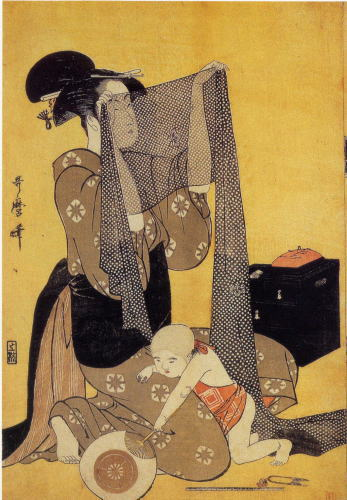
Hari-shigoto ("Needlework"), c. 1794–95

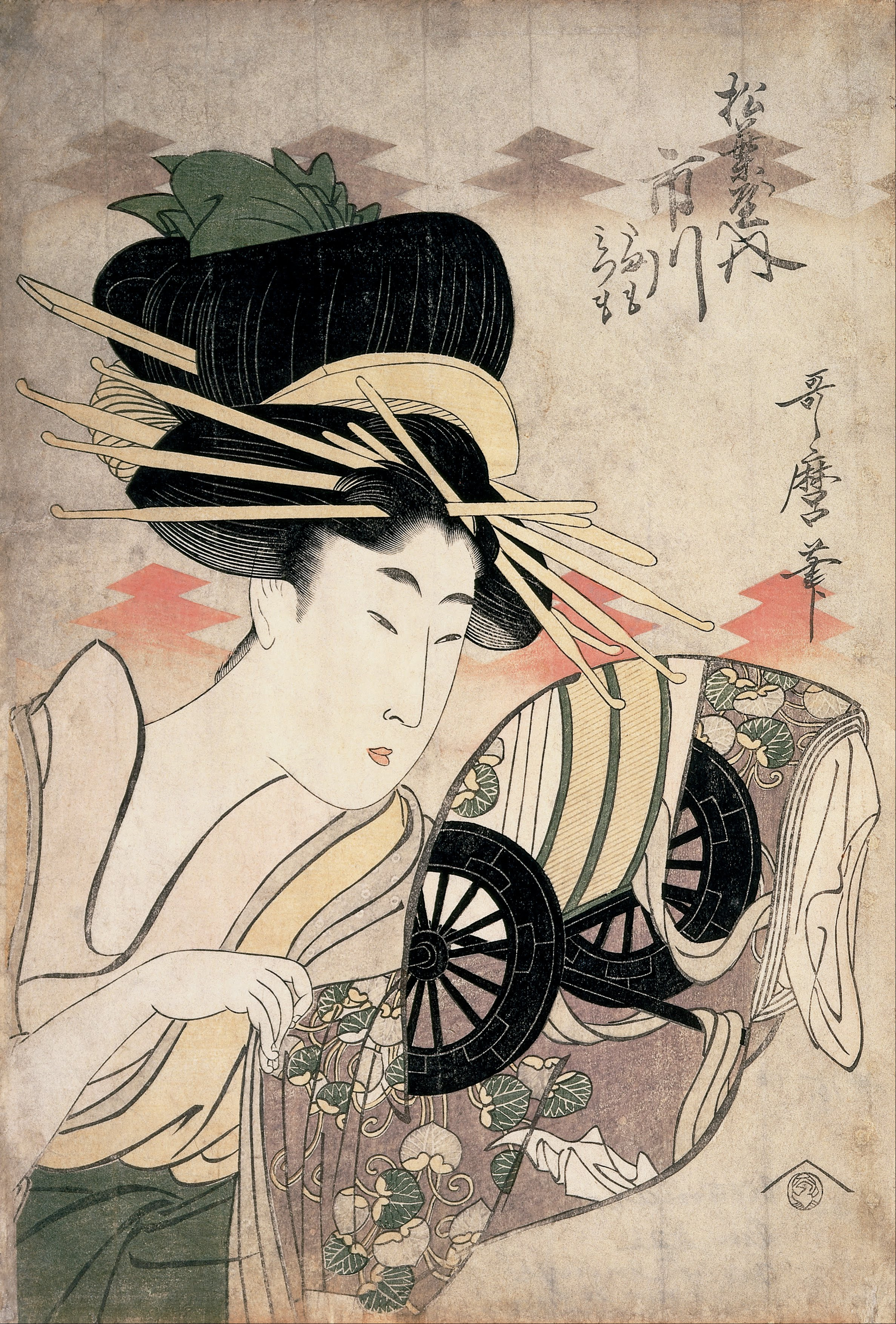
The Courtesan Ichikawa of the Matsuba Establishment from the series Famous Beauties of Edo

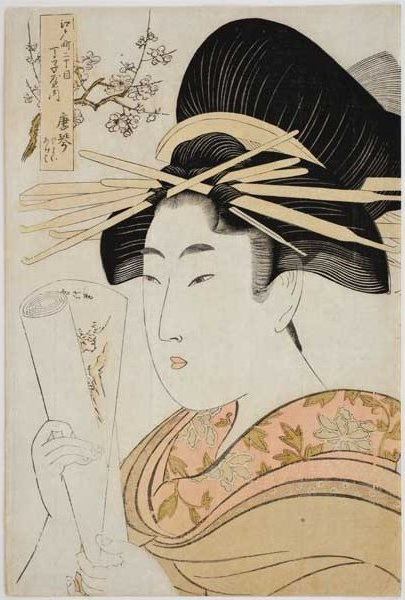
Karagoto of the House of Chojiya in Edo-cho Nichome from the series A Comparison of Courtesan Flowers

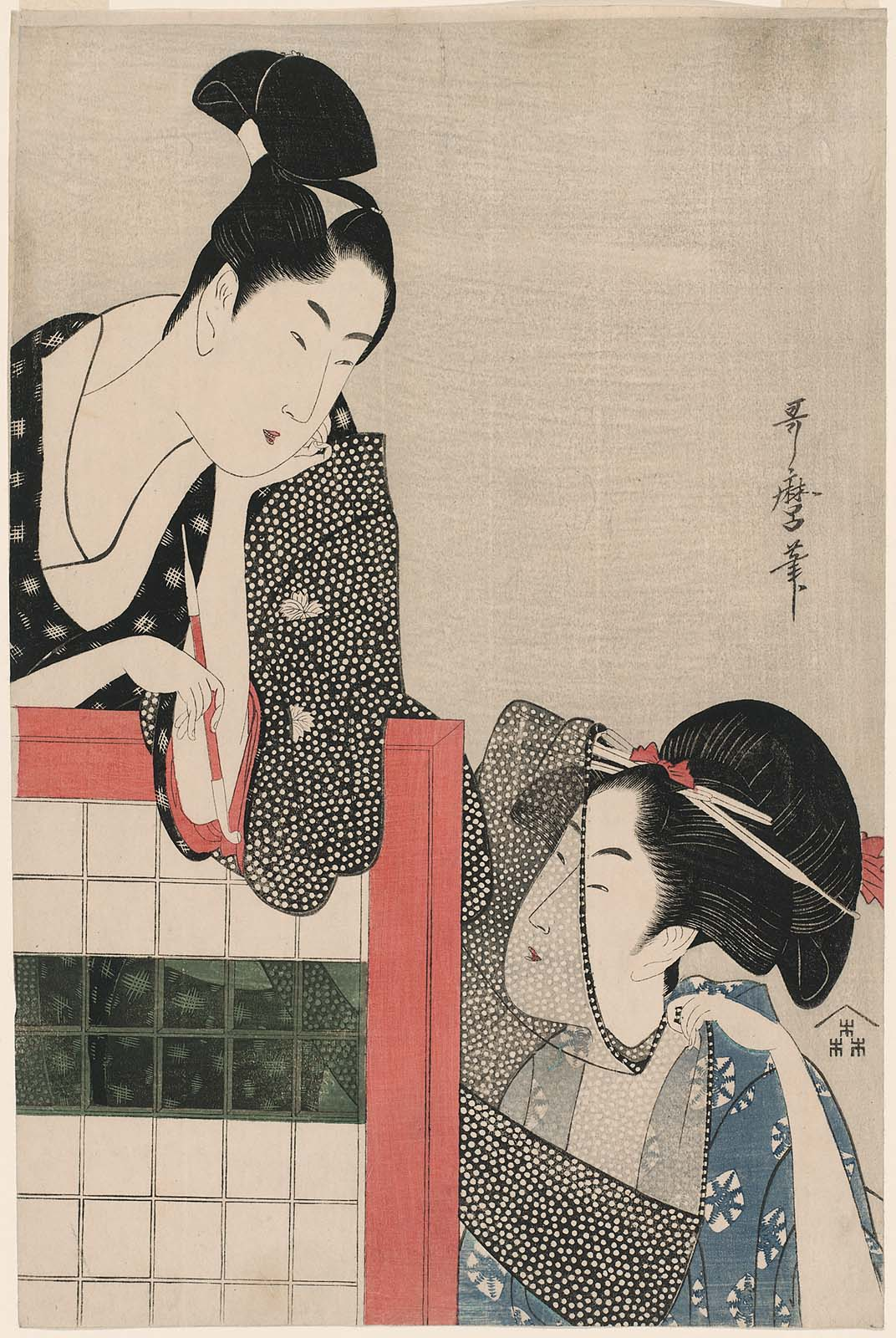
Tsuitate no Danjo, c. 1797

Mother and Child

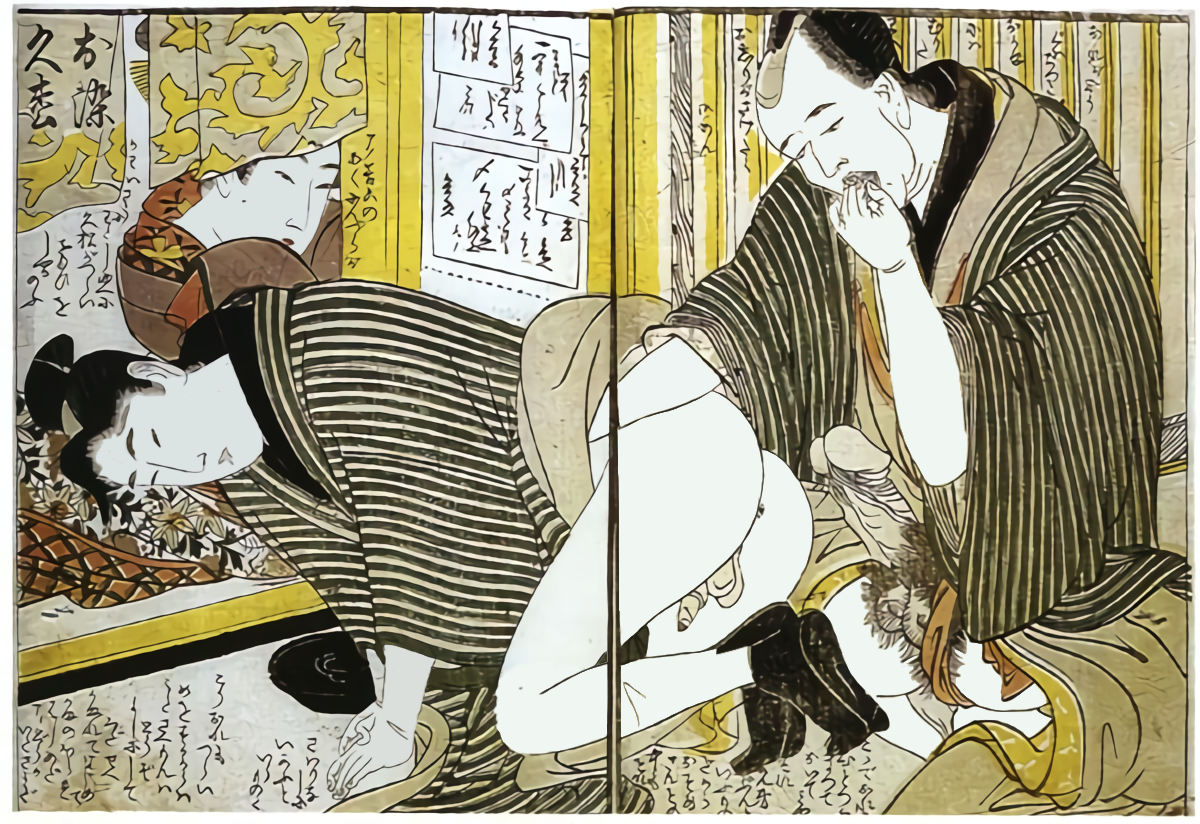
Man lubricating a male prostitute while someone in the background peeks through the curtains and watches

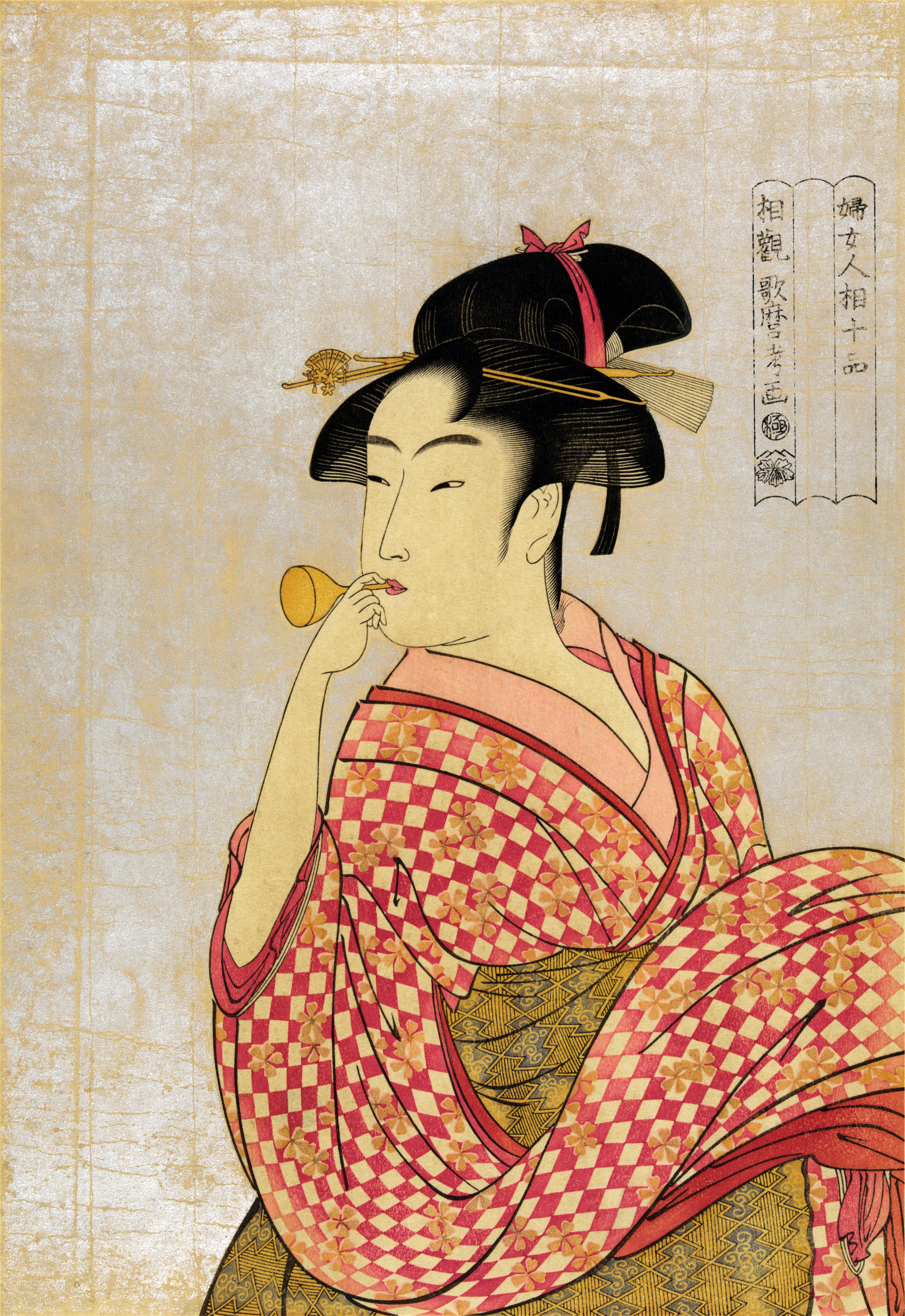
Young lady blowing on a poppin
