= Sugatami Shichinin Keshō =

Series of woodblock prints by Kitagawa Utamaro

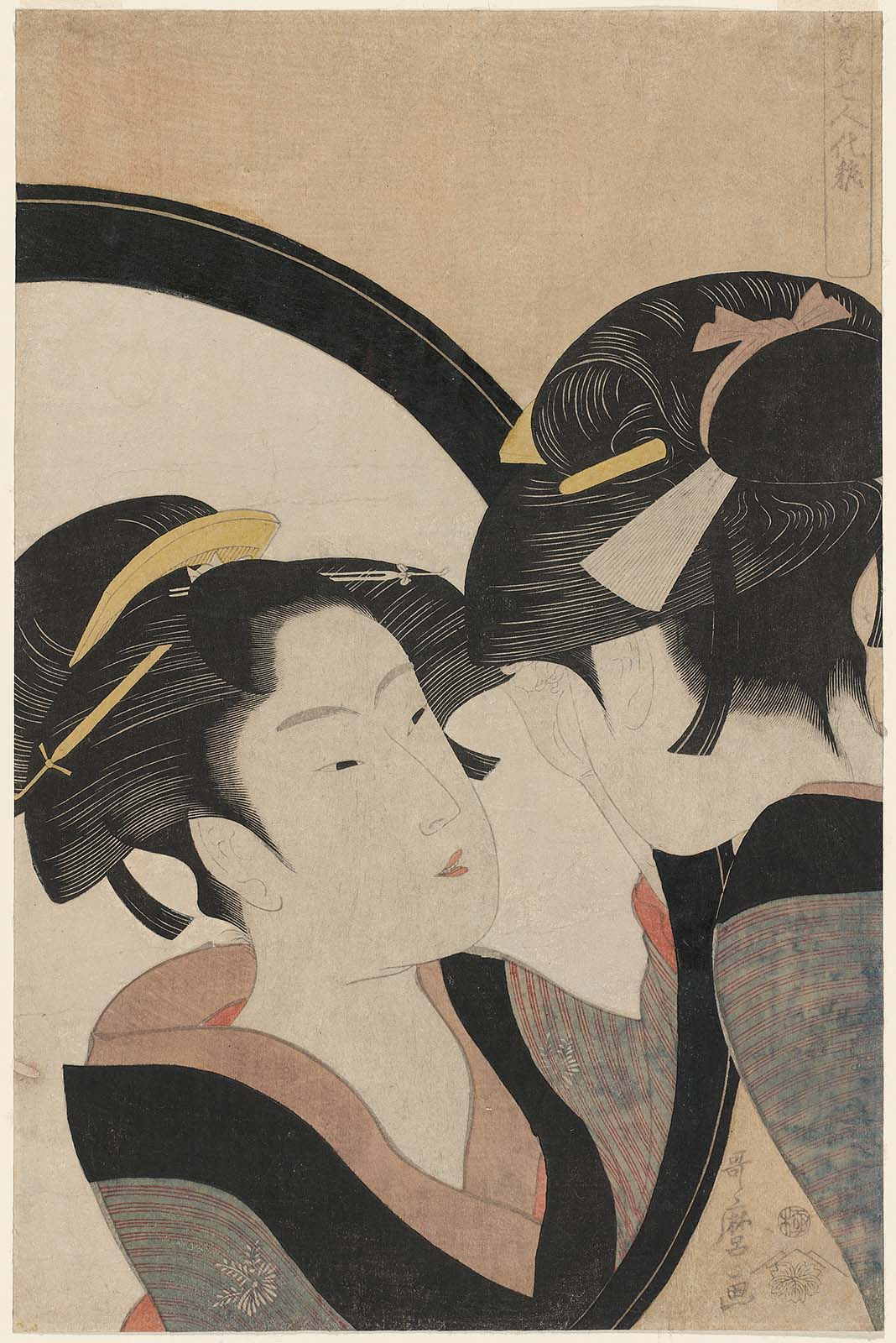
Sugatami Shichinin Keshō, Utamaro, coloured pigment on handmade washi paper, c. 1792–93, 37 by 25 centimetres (14.6 in × 9.8 in)

Sugatami Shichinin Keshō (姿見七人化粧, "Seven Women Applying Make-up Using a Mirror", c. 1792–93) is the title of what was likely a seven-print series by the Japanese ukiyo-e artist Kitagawa Utamaro. Only one print from the presumed series is known, and is believed to be of the tea-house girl Naniwa O-Kita.

The print has also appeared under the title Bijin Keshō no Zu (美人化粧之図, "Picture of Woman Applying Makeup").

== Description ==
The vertical nishiki-e multicolour print is in o-ban size—about 37 by 25 centimetres (15 in × 10 in). (Note: Sizes vary from copy to copy depending on how the paper was cut, aging, and other factors.) It was published by Tsutaya Jūzaburō and is signed Utamaro ga (歌麿画, "drawn by Utamaro"). The mirror's background is dusted with mica to give it a glittering effect.

The print bears the title Sugatami Shichinin Keshō, which suggests it was—or was intended to be—part of a seven-print series. The young woman in the print is seen from behind, her body cropped off the right edge. Her face appears reflected as she peers into a large mirror with her right hand on her hair. Both her face and the nape of her neck are visible; the nape of the neck was considered particularly sensual in Edo-period Japan. The subject does not pose like a model, but rather appears relaxed, away from the gaze of the public; Utamaro made many such candid portraits, emphasizing the beauty of the whole body—fingers, the nape of the neck, and such—rather than just the face.

The print does not indicate the subject, but from the long, slit-like almond-shaped eyes, the bridge of her nose, and paulownia crest on her kimono, it is believed she is the tea-house girl Naniwa O-Kita, who appears in other Utamaro prints, such as Tōji San Bijin, in which she is identified by the same clues. Contemporary purchasers of the print likely recognized her from the crest. Utamaro had named his subjects in earlier prints, but under the increasingly strict Kansei Reforms of the 1790s it became illegal to name entertainers in prints.
