= Hari-shigoto =

Color triptych print by Kitagawa Utamaro

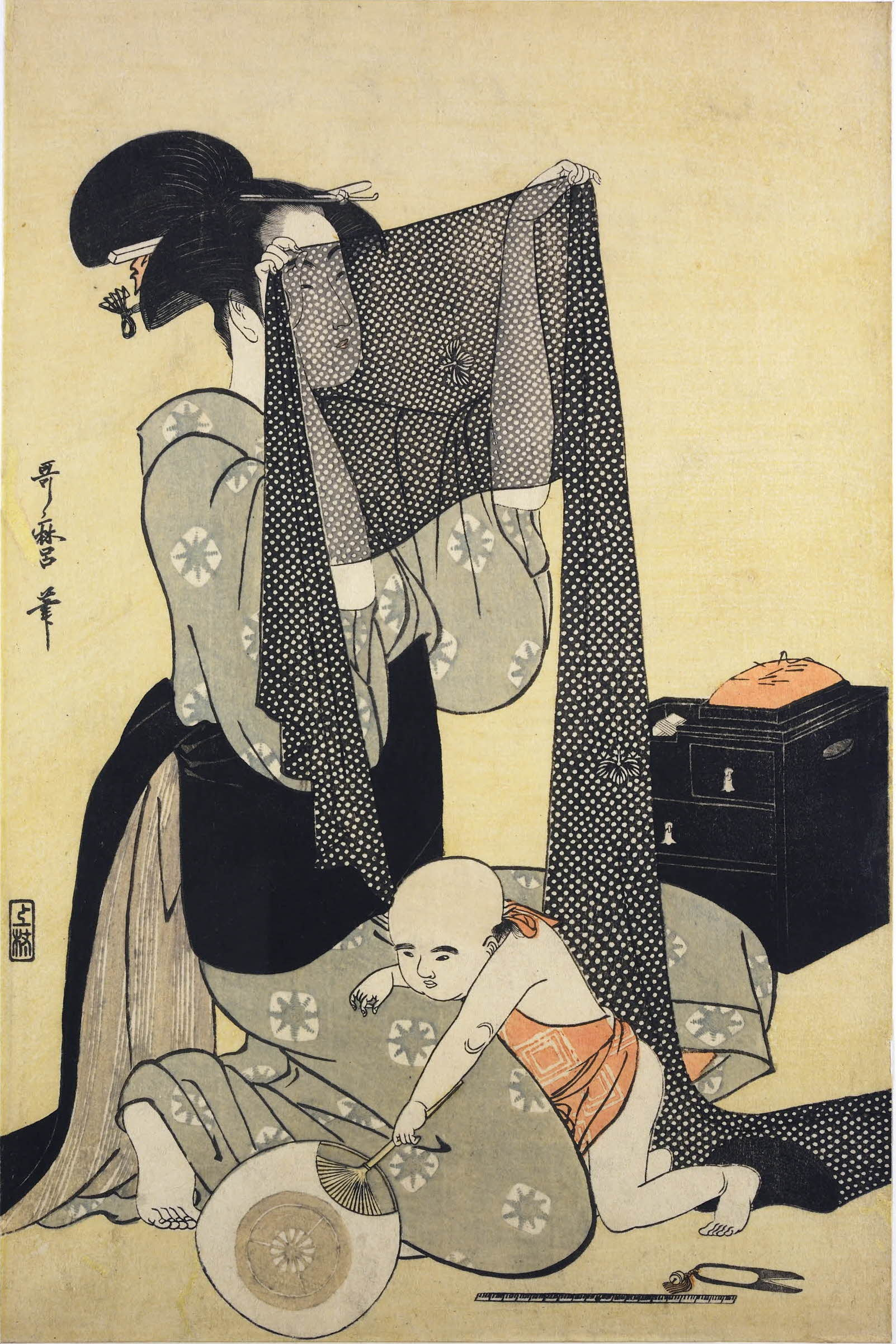
Left sheet of the triptych Hari-shigoto, Utamaro, multicolour woodblock print, c. 1794–95

Hari-shigoto (針仕事, "Needlework", c. 1794–95) is a colour triptych print by the Japanese ukiyo-e artist Kitagawa Utamaro (c. 1753 – 1806). It depicts women working with cloth at home with children playing around them. Critics hold the prints in high regard, in particular the skill required to reproduce the translucent effect of the cloth with woodblock prints.

== Background ==
Ukiyo-e art flourished in Japan during the Edo period from the 17th to 19th centuries, and took as its primary subjects courtesans, kabuki actors, and others associated with the "floating world" lifestyle of the pleasure districts. Alongside paintings, mass-produced woodblock prints were a major form of the genre. In the mid-18th century full-colour nishiki-e prints became common, printed using a large number of woodblocks, one for each colour. A prominent genre was bijin-ga ("pictures of beauties"), which depicted most often courtesans and geisha at leisure, and promoted the entertainments of the pleasure districts.

Kitagawa Utamaro (c. 1753–1806) made his name in the 1790s with his bijin ōkubi-e ("large-headed pictures of beautiful women") portraits, focusing on the head and upper torso, a style others had previously employed in portraits of kabuki actors. Utamaro experimented with line, colour, and printing techniques to bring out subtle differences in the features, expressions, and backdrops of subjects from a wide variety of class and background.

Utamaro's individuated beauties were in contrast to the stereotyped, idealized images that had been the norm. He set many prints in scenes of daily life and depicted a wider variety of women in a greater range of situations than was usual in ukiyo-e, often including scenes of mothers with their children.

== Publication ==
The set of three multicolour nishiki-e prints forms a triptych and was published in c. 1794–95 by Uemura Yohei. Each sheet is ōban size, measuring about 37 by 25 centimetres (15 in × 10 in) (Note: Sizes vary from copy to copy depending on how the paper was cut, aging, and other factors.) and bears Uemura's mark (上村) and the seal Utamaru hitsu (哥麿筆, "the brush of Utamaro").

About the same time, Uemura published an untitled ōban-sized five-print series by Utamaro with the same yellowish backgrounds depicting woman in domestic situations. Like the Hari-shigoto triptych, the woman appear full-length and subtly bare their legs in semierotic postures. It is assumed the series is somehow related to Harishigoto.

== Description ==
Set against a blank, yellowish background, the picture displays a scene of women doing with children playing around them, one in each print. Utamaro is known for the eroticism of his work which he displays subtly even in this middle-class domestic scene via exposed legs and breasts and suggestive poses.

Hari-shigoto

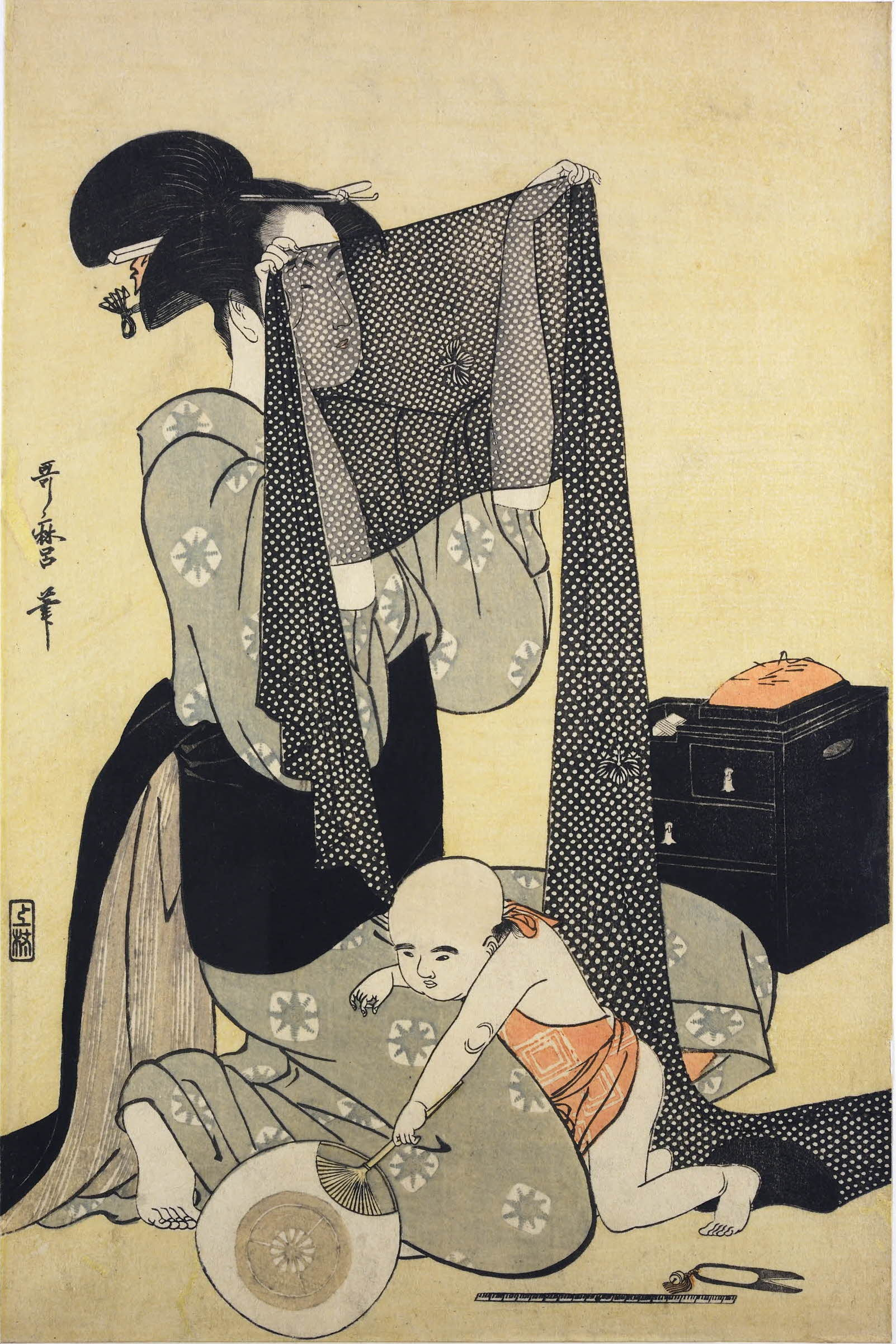

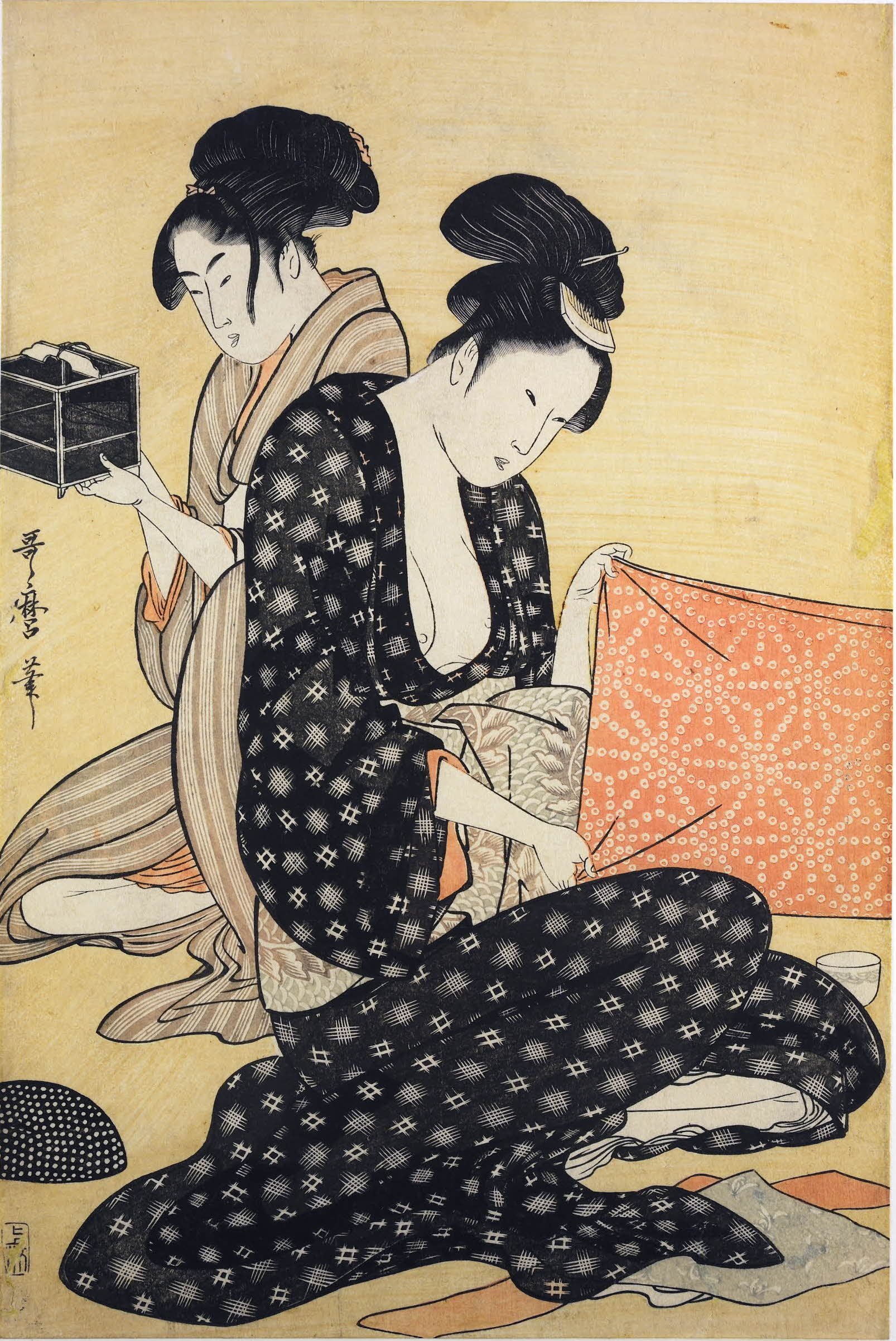

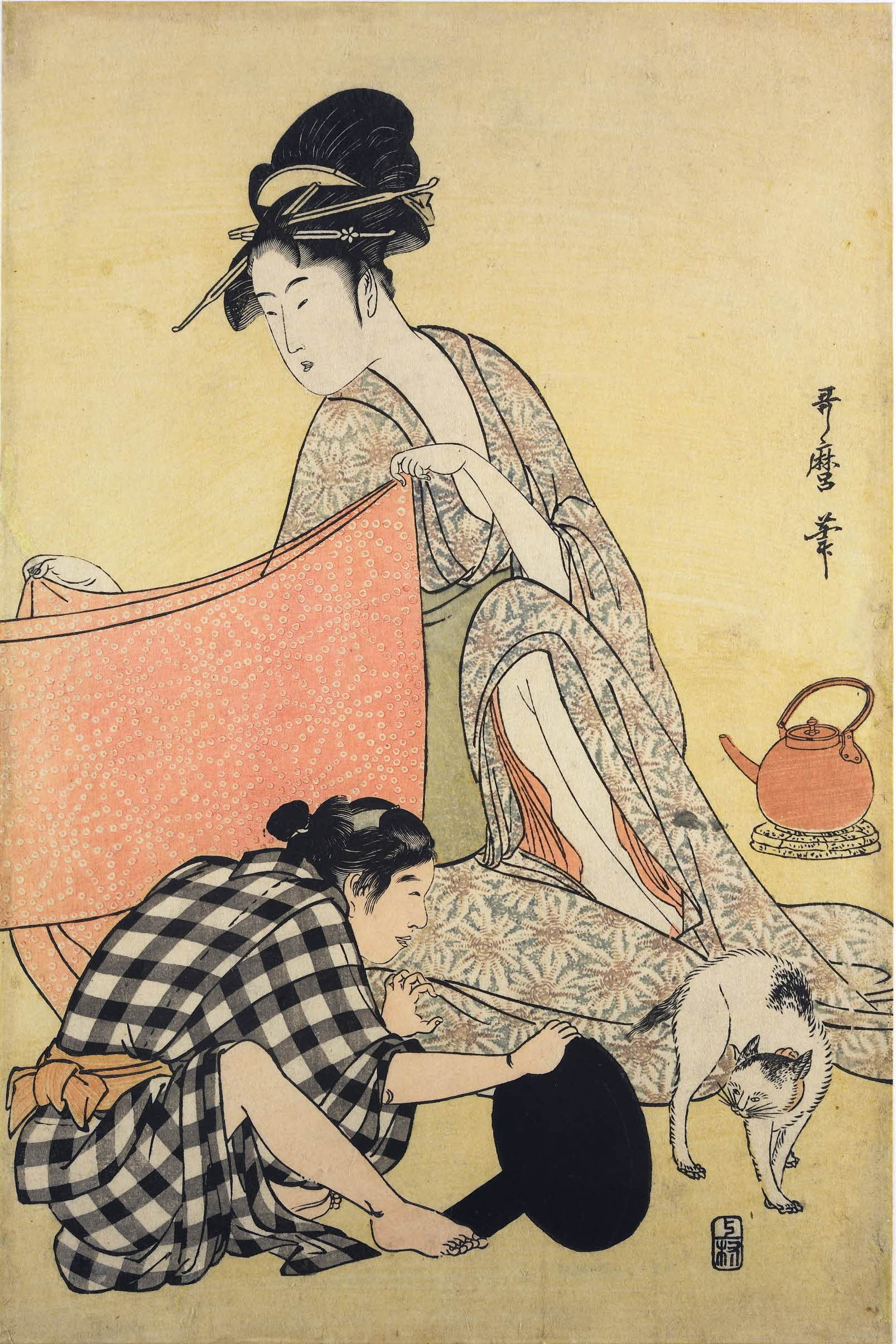

In the centre sits an older woman with shaved eyebrows, indicating she is married. She holds one end of a red obi sash decorated with a hemp-leaf pattern; a young woman in the right print holds the other end. They fold it as they take measurements. In front of the women in the right print a young boy shows a cat its reflection in a hand mirror and laughs; the threatened cat's hair stands on end. An adolescent girl in the back of the middle print gazes in an insect cage, possibly at a firefly or cricket.

In the left print an aproned child climbs onto the lap of another young woman, playing with a round hand fan. The child crawls at the woman's groin and spreads her legs. The woman holds up a deep blue, dot-patterned, translucent, silk gauze before her face. The skill required to reproduce the translucent effect of the cloth via woodblock printing has gained the prints a particularly high critical regard.

== Known copies ==
Copies of the set reside in the collections of the Tokyo National Museum, the Hiraki Ukiyo-e Foundation in Yokohama, Mizuta Art Museum in Saitama Prefecture, the Japan Ukiyo-e Museum in Nagano Prefecture, the Museum of Asian Art in Berlin, the Royal Museums of Art and History in Brussels, the New York Public Library, the Worcester Art Museum, and the Yale University Art Gallery. The British Museum has two sets, and the Galerie Berès has a copy of the left sheet.
