= Tsukimaro =

Japanese ukiyo-e artist

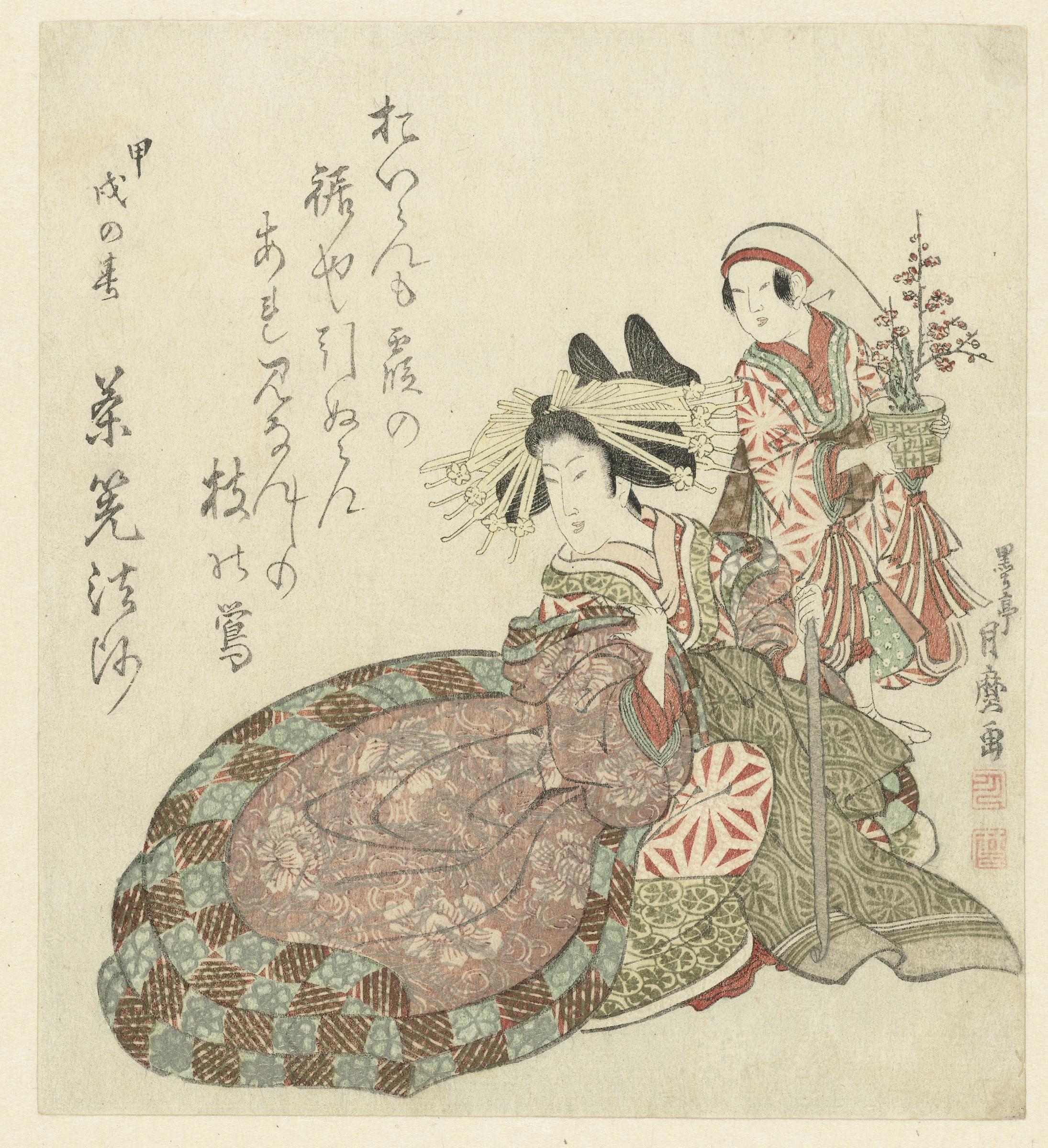
Courtesan with servant, 1814

Kitagawa Tsukimaro (喜多川 月麿, fl. c. 1794–1836) was a Japanese ukiyo-e artist. He was one of the most successful students of Kitagawa Utamaro (c. 1753 – 1806), from whom he took the -maro. Following a common practice, Utamaro delegated the execution of parts of some of his designs to his pupils Kikumaro (Tsukimaro's early name), Hidemaro and Takemaro. His early works bear the name "Kikumaro", first written 菊麿 (kiku meaning "chrysanthemum") until 1802, then 喜久麿 (kiku meaning "joy eternal") until he changed it in 1804 to "Tsukimaro" (tsuki meaning "moon").

Little is known of Tsukimaro's life. His personal name was Jun (潤) but he also had other nicknames (子達 or 士達). He worked as a watchman in Kodenmachō Sanchōme in Edo (modern Tokyo), and at some point apprenticed under Utamaro. He specialized in bijin-ga portrait prints of female beauties. In 1804 he was one of the artists along with Utamaro who were arrested and manacled for making illegal prints of the 16th-century military leader Toyotomi Hideyoshi. Around 1820 he changed his name to Kansetsu (観雪) and turned to scroll paintings in the Maruyama–Maruyama–Shijō style. His last dated work is an illustration for a kyōka poetry anthology of 1836. He also used the art names Sumitei (墨亭) and Shūsai (逎斎), as well as the gō Bokutei, Kansetsusai and Yūsai. gō Bokutei, Kansetsusai and Yūsai. Considered one of Utamaro's foremost pupils, Tsukimaro also worked as a watchman at Kodenmachō Sanchōme Umaya Shindō..
