= Kasen Koi no Bu =

Series of woodblock prints by Kitagawa Utamaro

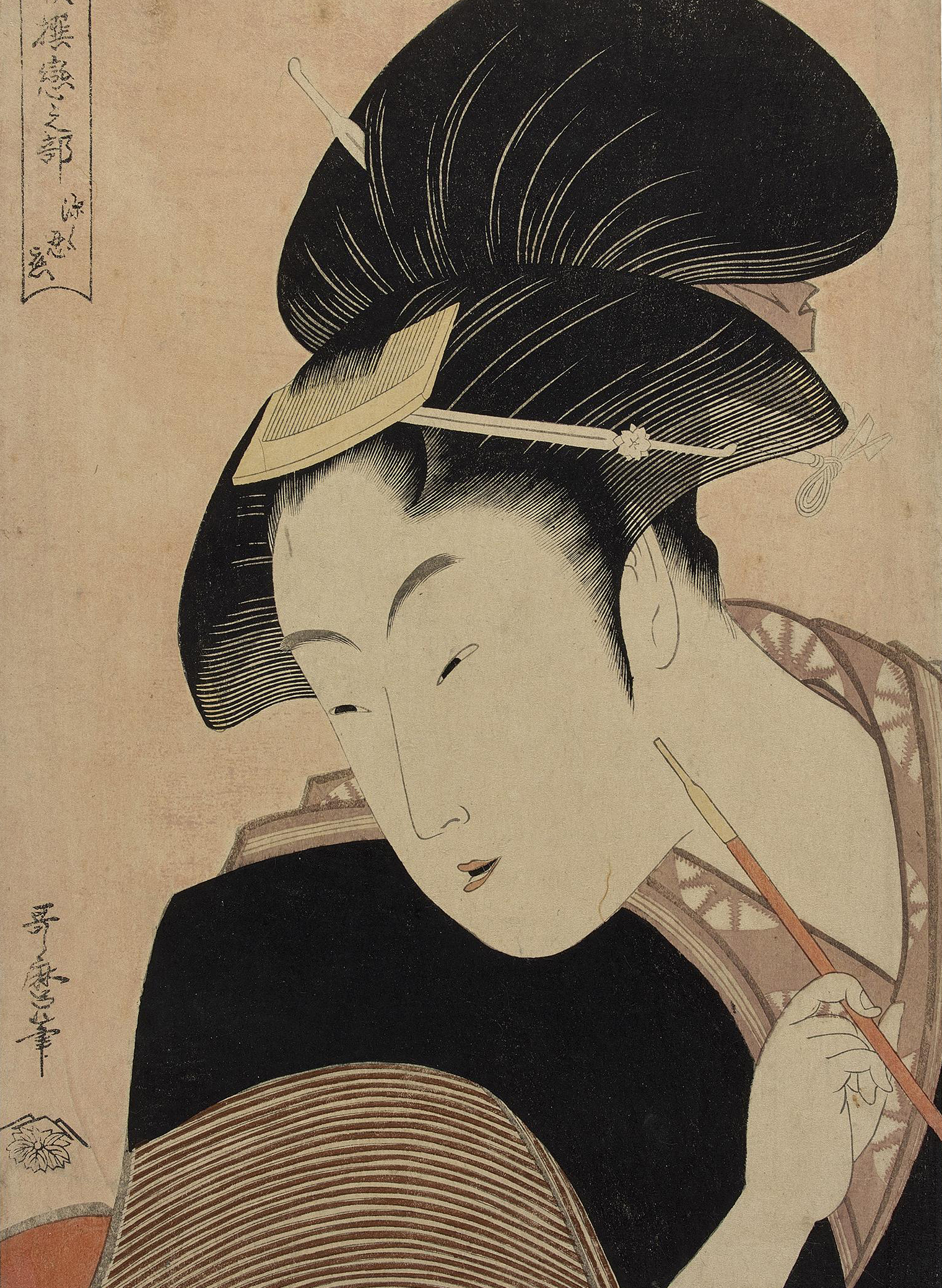
Fukaku Shinobu Koi, which in 2016 set the record price for an ukiyo-e print sold at auction at €745000

Kasen Koi no Bu (歌撰恋之部, "Anthology of Poems: The Love Section") is a series of five ukiyo-e prints designed by the Japanese artist Utamaro and published c. 1793–94.

The series title parodies the section headings in waka and kyōka poetry anthologies, and takes the theme of love. The women depicted are not courtesans or others employed in the pleasure districts, who were the typically subjects of ukiyo-e portraits of beauties. The prints were printed by Tsutaya Jūzaburō using luxurious techniques such as dusting the backgrounds with rose-coloured mica. In 2016 the print Fukaku Shinobu Koi set the record price for an ukiyo-e print sold at auction at €745000.

== Background ==
Ukiyo-e art flourished in Japan during the Edo period from the 17th to 19th centuries, and took as its primary subjects courtesans, kabuki actors, and others associated with the "floating world" lifestyle of the pleasure districts. Alongside paintings, mass-produced woodblock prints were a major form of the genre. In the mid-18th century full-colour nishiki-e prints became common, printed using a large number of woodblocks, one for each colour. A prominent genre was bijin-ga ("pictures of beauties"), which depicted most often courtesans and geisha at leisure, and promoted the entertainments of the pleasure districts.

Kitagawa Utamaro (c. 1753–1806) made his name in the 1790s with his bijin ōkubi-e ("large-headed pictures of beautiful women") portraits, focusing on the head and upper torso, a style others had previously employed in portraits of kabuki actors. Utamaro experimented with line, colour, and printing techniques to bring out subtle differences in the features, expressions, and backdrops of subjects from a wide variety of class and background. Utamaro's individuated beauties were in sharp contrast to the stereotyped, idealized images that had been the norm.

== Description and analysis ==
The five bijin ōkubi-e pictures in the series are nishiki-e multicolour woodblock prints in ōban size, about 39 by 25 centimetres (15 in × 10 in). They were published c. 1793–94 by Tsutaya Jūzaburō using luxurious printing techniques. The backgrounds are dusted with glittering beni-kira, (Note: 紅雲母 beni-kira, also read beni-unmo) a dust made of lepidolite, a rose-coloured type of mica, used to emphasize the theme of love.

The women in this series are not courtesans or others employed in the pleasure districts, who were typically the subjects of ukiyo-e bijin-ga. Compared to Utamaro's similar earlier series Fujin Sōgaku Jittai and Fujo Ninsō Juppin, the faces are much more close up, and the facial features and expressions more individuated and finely detailed. By focusing on the theme of love in Kasen Koi no Bu, Utamaro challenges himself to express the inner emotional states of his subjects. The prints in this series have garnered particularly favourable praise amongst Utamaro's large body of work.

The characters in the term kasen (歌撰, "anthology of poems") is a neologism of Utamaro's; it is thought to parody the terms kasen (歌仙, "great poet[s]") and senka (撰歌, "selection of poems"). Koi no Bu (恋之部, "The Love Section") parodies the section headings in waka and kyōka poetry anthologies, which typically have sections on love, the four seasons, and other themes. Ukiyo-e series on the subject of the four seasons are common, and Utamaro may have chosen "love" in conscious response to that. Utamaro had a history of providing illustrations for poetry collections, such as the Tsutaya-published E-iri Kyōka-bon (Note: 絵入り狂歌本 E-iri Kyōka-bon, "Illustrated Book of Kyōka Poems") of c. 1789–90.

=== Mare ni Au Koi ===
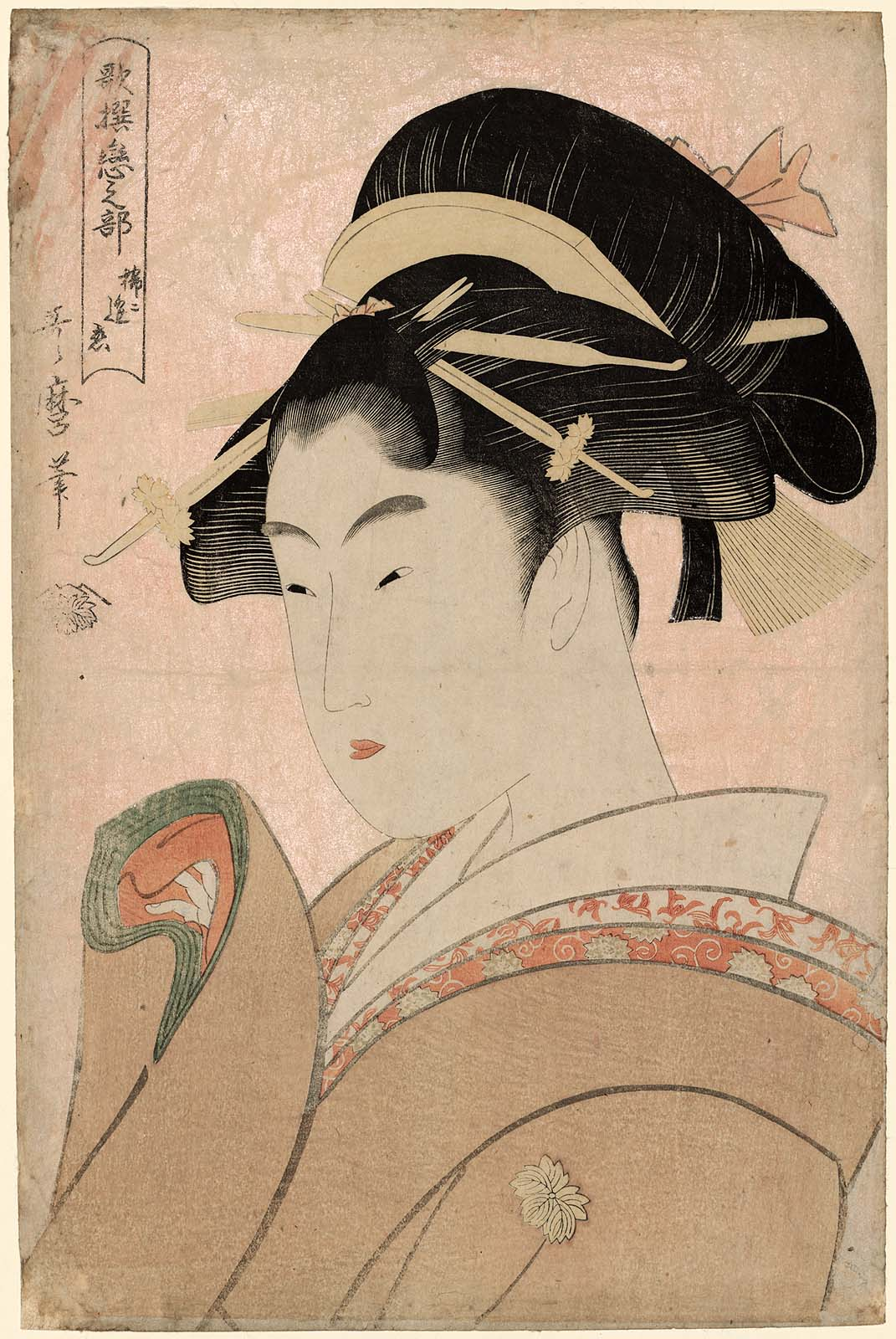

The woman in Mare ni Au Koi (稀ニ逢恋, "love that rarely meets") appears quite young and sheltered; she is probably in her teens. She wears an ornate kushi-kanzashi comb-shaped hairpin and bashfully sticks her fingers just barely from the sleeve of her kimono. The title refers not to a woman who rarely meets her lover, but to a shy young woman inexperienced in love, and her expression is the most withdrawn in the series.

=== Mono-omoi Koi ===
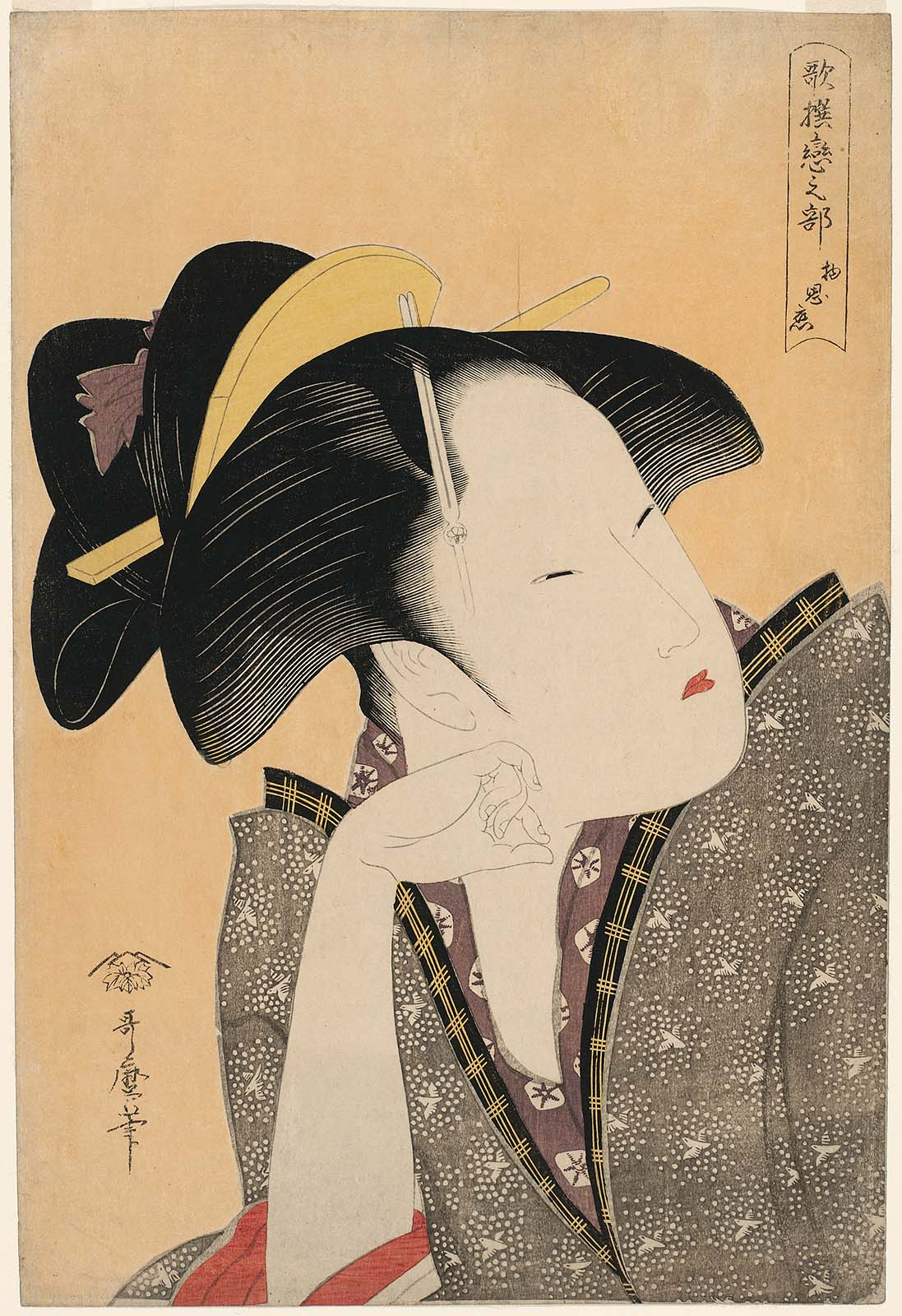

The woman in Mono-omoi Koi (物思恋, "reflective love" or "anxious love") has her eyebrows shaved—sign of a married woman. She appears to be the eldest in the series—perhaps even middle-aged—and to come from an affluent background. She wears an elegant, subdued kimono with a pattern of plovers.

The woman rests her right cheek lightly on the back of her right hand and narrows her eyes in thought. In line with the theme of the series, she must be pondering love—perhaps an illegitimate lover or old memories of love. Some consider it the finest example from the series, and others suggest the picture pairs with Fukaku Shinobu Koi.

=== Fukaku Shinobu Koi ===
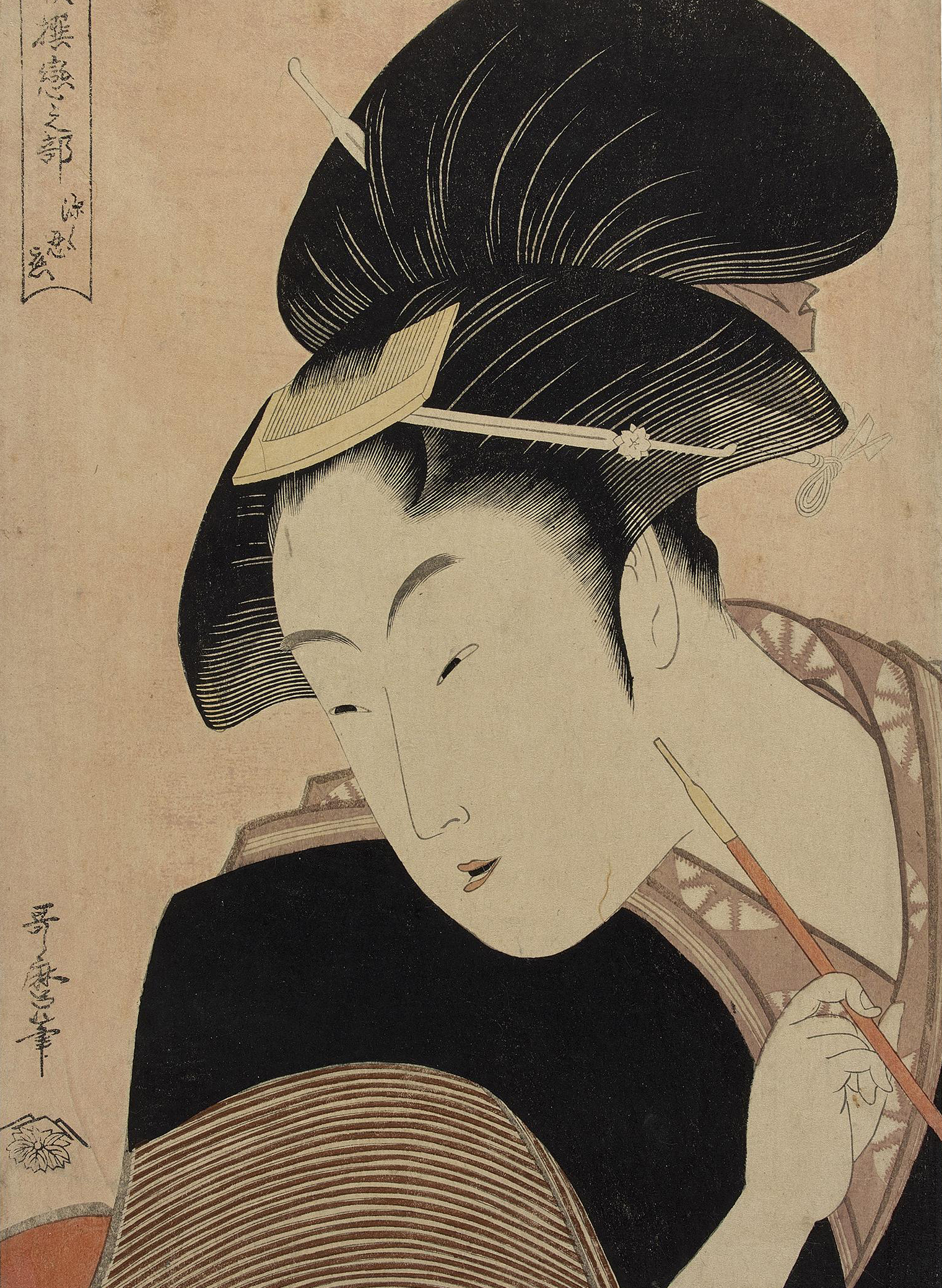

The woman in Fukaku Shinobu Koi (深く忍恋, "deeply hidden love") has blackened her teeth with ohaguro, which normally signifies a married woman, but she lacks the shaved eyebrows that would also signify her being married; she is perhaps yet young and recently married. Her ornate kanzashi hairpin has a flower design on it. She looks down and holds a kiseru tobacco pipe in her right hand. She stares off, her shoulders raised, eyes narrowed, and tiny lips pursed, as if in deep, emotional mid-sigh.

The title suggests the woman may be pondering a risky affair. Utamaro uses a limited number of colours in the print; the deep blacks of the protective collar around her kimono and her large, rounded hairstyle draws the attention, contrasting with the white of the woman's face and nape of her neck.

In 2016 Fukaku Shinobu Koi set the record price for an ukiyo-e print sold at auction at €745000.

=== Arawaruru Koi ===
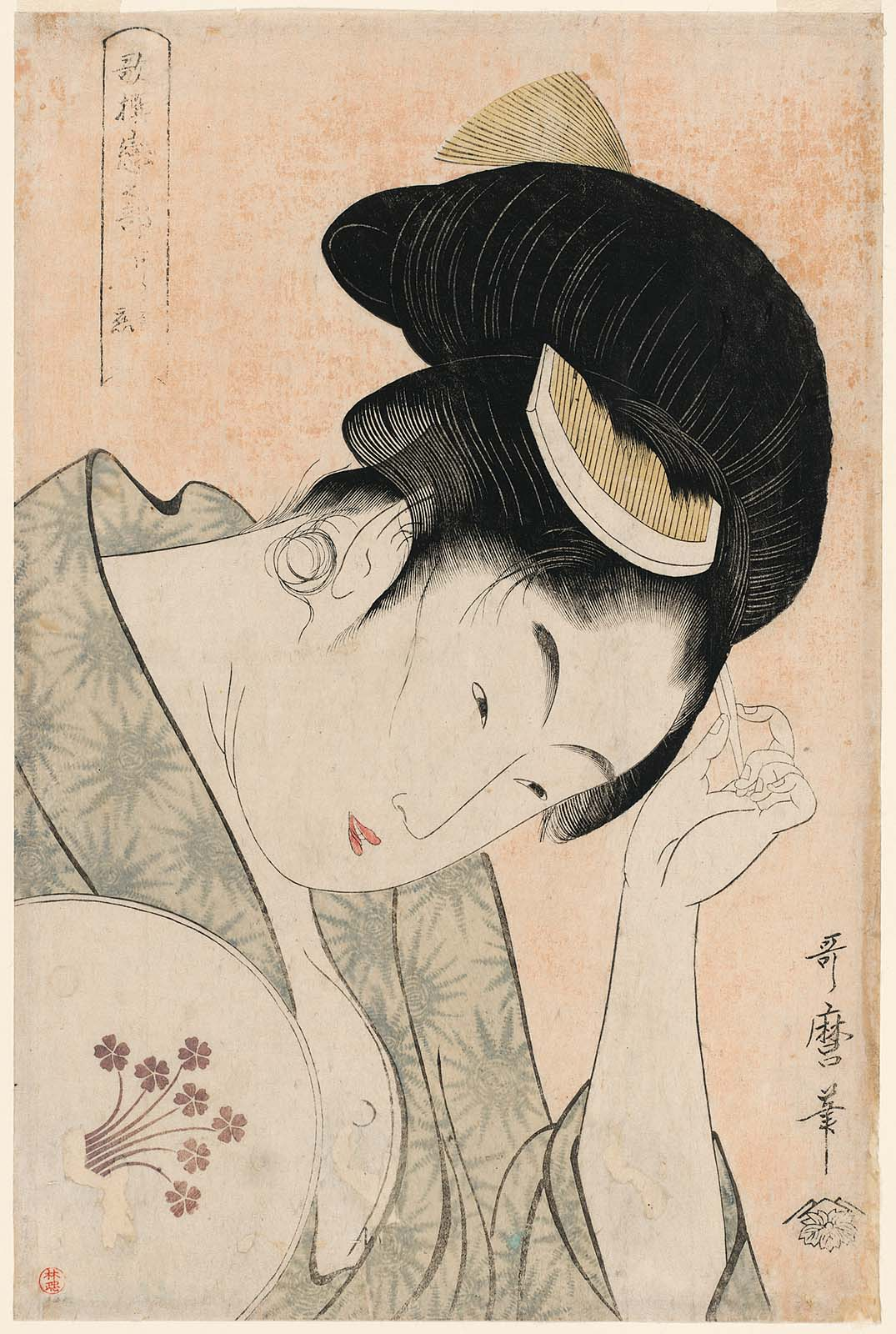

Arawaruru Koi (あらはるる恋, (Note: るる -ruru is the attributive form of the verb in Classical Japanese.) "obvious love") presents the most openly sensual print in the series. The plump, sensual woman seems to care little that her kimono is open, exposing a breast. Her hairdo is in disarray, the kanzashi hairpin at the front about to fall off, and she holds one of the hairpins in her left hand. She appears to be looking down outside the frame of the print, perhaps in mid-conversation. The term arawaruru koi refers to a love so wholehearted that it expresses itself in the subject's face and mannerisms.

=== Yogoto ni Au Koi ===
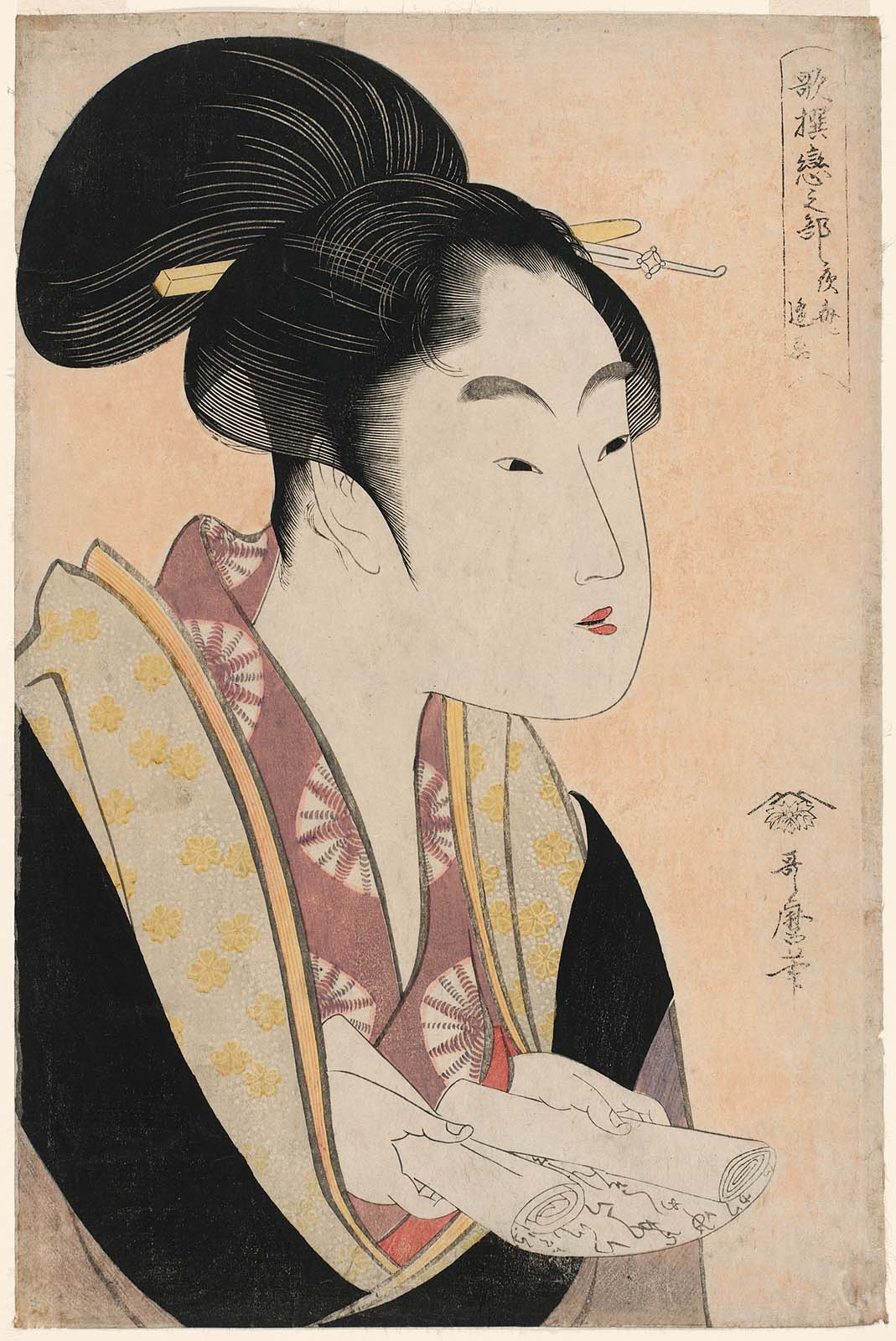

The woman in Yogoto ni Au Koi (夜毎ニ逢恋, "love that meets each night") raises her eyes in delight as she holds a letter out from the breast pocket of her kimono. The title suggests it is from a lover, perhaps calling her to another of their nightly trysts. Utamaro gives his subject a noble air and features pays close attention to realistic details of her face, such as the shape of her eyebrows and loose hairs straggling about.
