= Tsutaya =

Tsutaya is a Japanese word referring to a number of people and businesses. It is usually written 蔦屋, meaning "ivy shop".

== People ==
- Tsutaya Jūzaburō (1750–1797), woodblock publisher of ukiyo-e and popular illustrated books.

== Companies ==
- Tsutaya, Japanese video rental store and bookstore chain operated by Culture Convenience Club
  - Tsutaya Comic Award, sponsored by the company
