= Rice paddy art =

Japanese art form

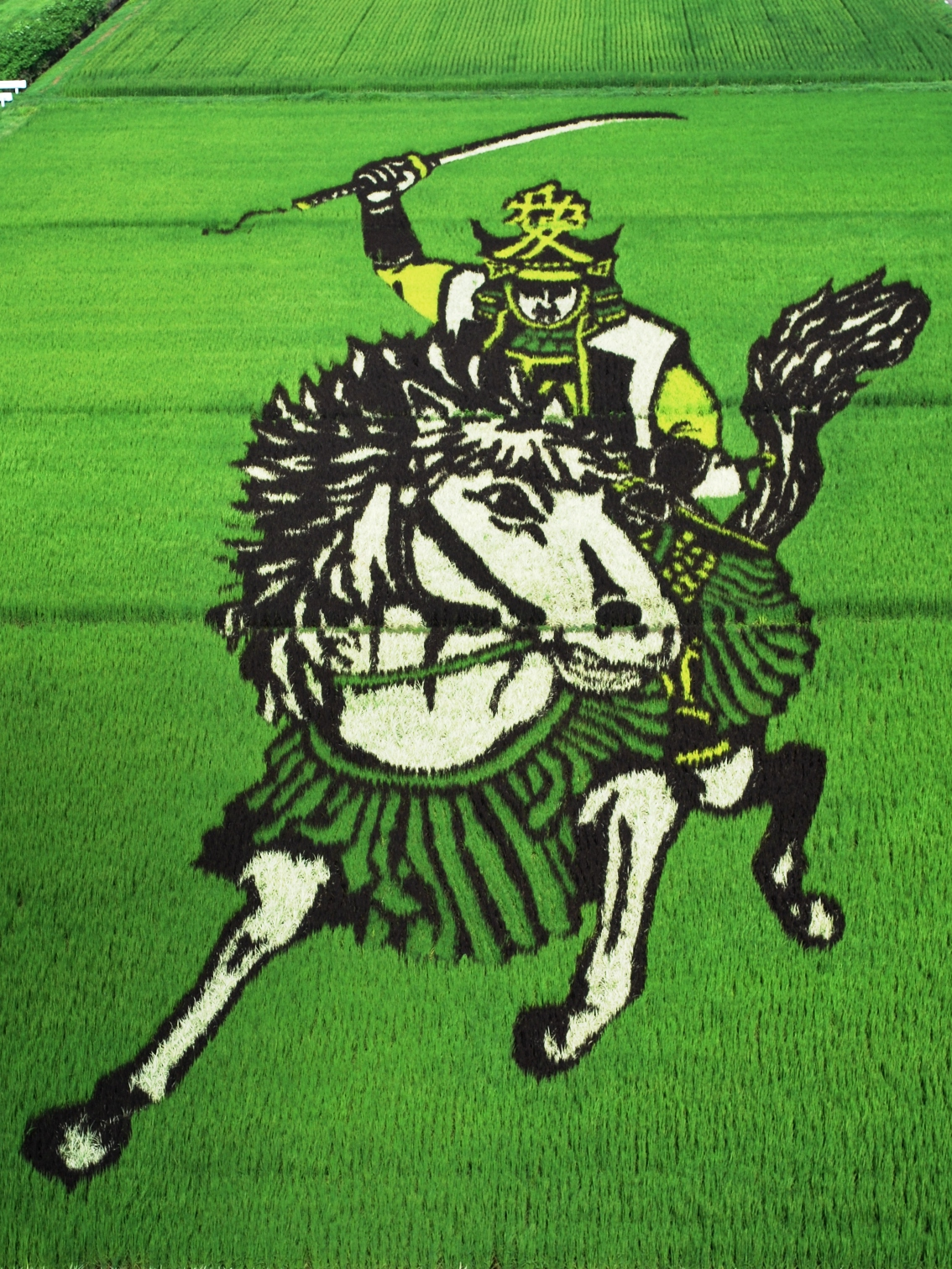
Depiction of Naoe Kanetsugu, a commander from the Sengoku period, in a rice field

Rice paddy art or tambo art (田んぼアート, tanbo āto) is an art form originating in Japan where people plant rice of various types and colors to create images in a paddy field.

== History ==
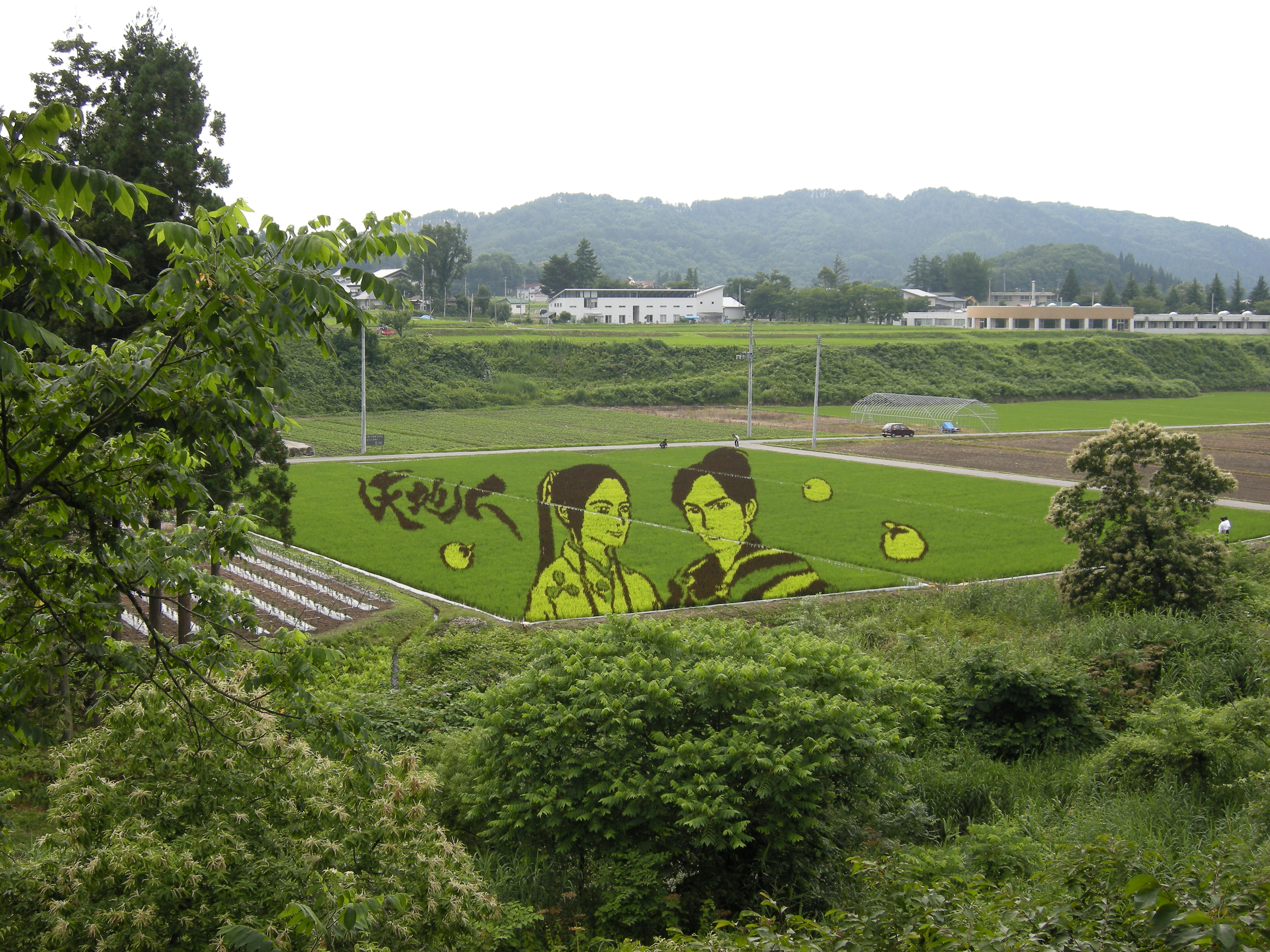
Tambo art in Yonezawa, Yamagata

In 1993, the people of Inakadate, in Aomori Prefecture, were looking for a way to revitalize their village. Archaeological exploration led to a realization that rice had been grown in the area for more than 2000 years. To honor this history, the villagers started a rice field behind the town hall. With the paddy as a canvas, the villagers cultivated and used four different types of heirloom and modern strains of rice to create a giant picture in the field. To allow viewing of the whole picture, a mock castle tower 22 meters high was erected at the village office. In 2006, more than 200,000 people visited the village to see the art.

Another observation tower was built looking down the Tambo art location 2 at Michi no eki Inakadate nicknamed “Yayoi no sato” or a village of prehistoric Yayoi period. Both places charge admission fees, while visitors are encouraged to take bus serving both location 1 and 2 to avoid traffic jam. In August 2015, a video camera was installed for both locations and started live stream the art, and they were registered on Google Street View the same year. A winter campaign since 2016 has been held on location 2 with instruction initially by snow artist Simon Beck.

For the first nine years, the farmers created a simple picture of Mount Iwaki before going to more complex designs.

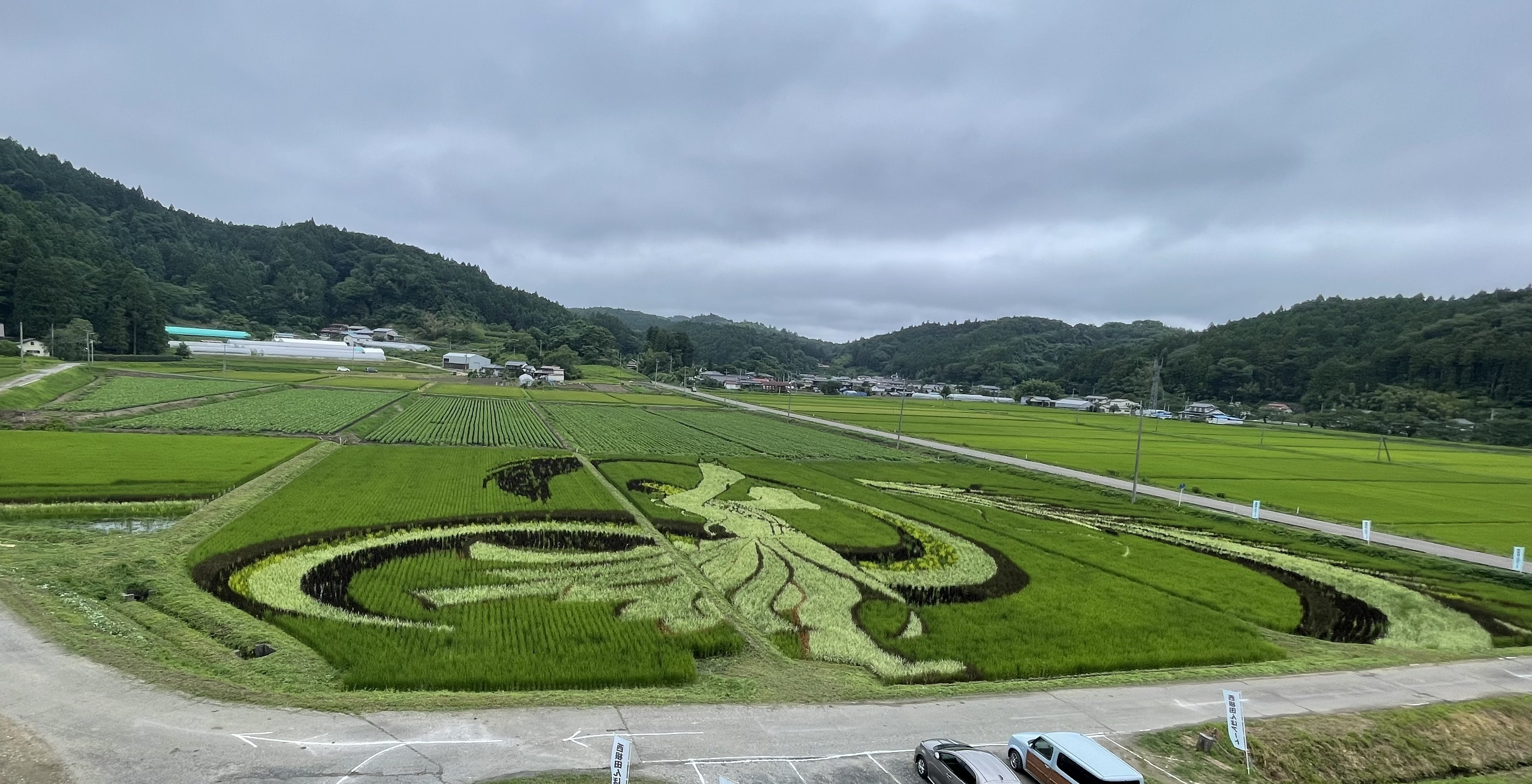
Rice Paddy Art inspired by Yuzuru Hanyu "One Summer's Day" program in Kakuda, Miyagi, Japan

Following Inakadate's example, other villages such as Yonezawa in Yamagata prefecture and Kakuda in Miyagi prefecture have started to create their own tambo art. In Kakuda, this initiative started in 2007, led by the Nishine Rice Paddy Art Enjoyment Group. Since 2019, the design of the rice paddy art in Kakuda depicts the two-time Olympic figure skating gold medallist Yuzuru Hanyu, who is a native from Sendai, Miyagi.

=== Inakadate designs ===
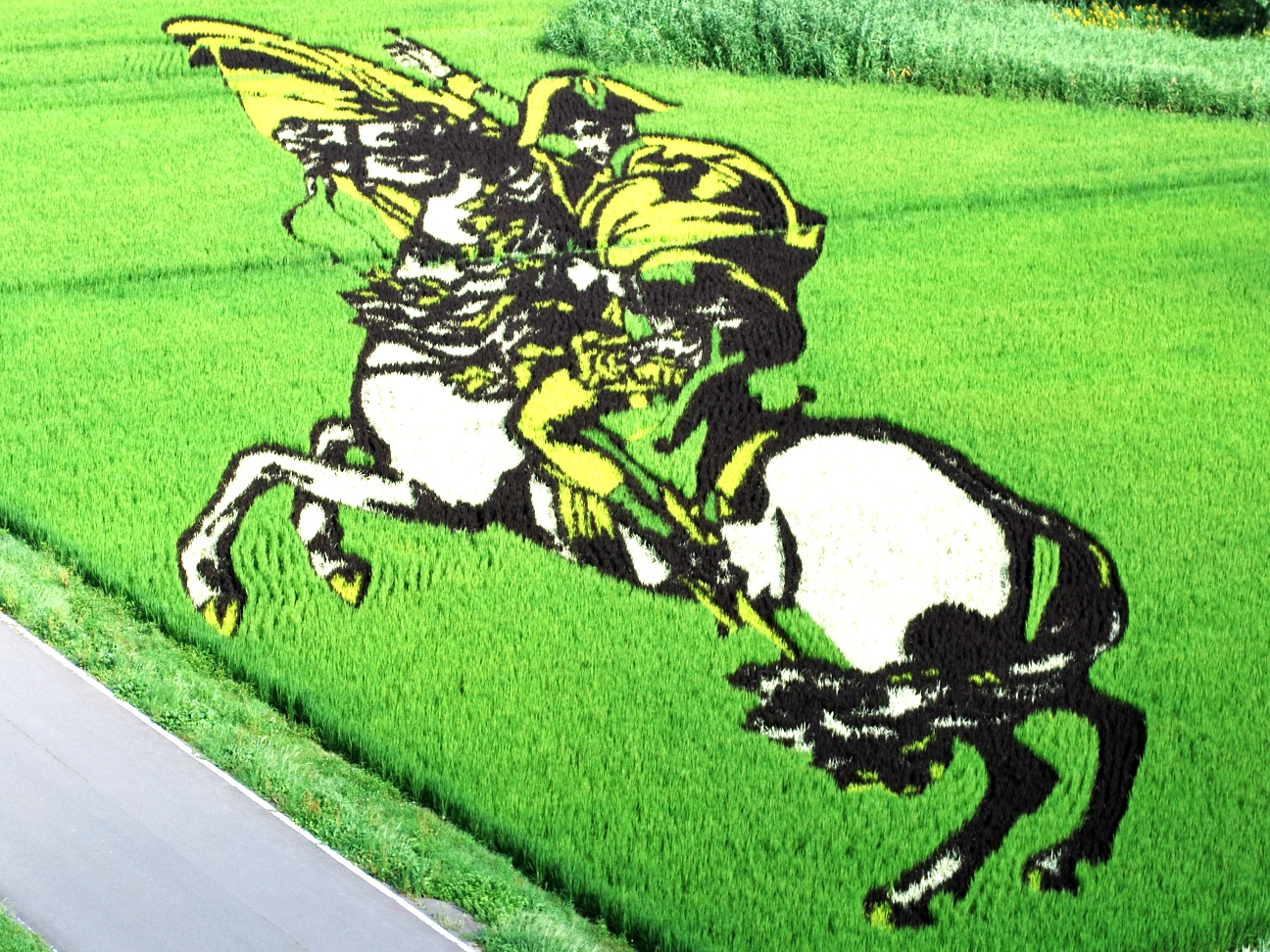
Napoleon (2009)

The following is a list of the designs that have been used in the Inakadate pictures.

- 2003
  - Leonardo da Vinci's Mona Lisa
- 2004
  - Shikō Munakata's The Ten Great Disciples of Buddha: Rāhula (釈迦十大弟子羅睺羅の柵) and Mountain God Princess (山神妃の柵)
- 2005
  - Sharaku's Kabuki Actor Ōtani Oniji III as Yakko Edobei (三代目大谷鬼次の奴江戸兵衛)
  - Utamaro's Anthology of Poems: The Love Section – Deeply Hidden Love (歌撰恋之部・深く忍恋)
- 2006
  - Tawaraya Sōtatsu's Wind God and Thunder God (風神雷神図屏風)
- 2007
  - Hokusai's The Great Wave off Kanagawa and Fine Wind, Clear Morning from Thirty-six Views of Mount Fuji
- 2008
  - Ebisu, Daikokuten
- 2009
  - Sengoku military commanders, Napoleon
- 2010
  - Battle of Gojo Bridge (五条大橋での戦い) by Benkei and Ushiwakamaru
- 2011
  - The Tale of the Bamboo Cutter
- 2012
  - Kanō Hōgai's Avalokitesvara as a Merciful Mother (悲母観音), and Acala
  - Seven Lucky Gods, Mazinger Z
- 2013
  - Oiran and Marilyn Monroe
  - Ultraman
- 2014
  - Mount Fuji and Legend of the Hagoromo (羽衣伝説)
  - Sazae-san
- 2015
  - Gone With the Wind
  - Star Wars: The Force Awakens
- 2016
  - Ishida Mitsunari and Sanada Masayuki from Sanadamaru,
  - Shin Godzilla
- 2017
  - Yamata no Orochi against Susanoo-no-mikoto
  - Momotarō
- 2018
  - Roman Holiday
  - Osamu Tezuka characters (Astro Boy etc.)
- 2019
  - Oshin
  - Gara piko poo (ガラピコぷ〜), a puppetry in Okaasan to Issho
- 2020
  - Neon Genesis Evangelion (It was canceled due to the spread of COVID-19.)
- 2021
  - Itomichi (いとみち)
- 2022
  - Mona Lisa and Kuroda Seiki's Lakeside (湖畔)
  - From the Jōmon to the Yayoi
- 2023
  - Girl with a Pearl Earring and Shikō Munakata's Setting Out in the World (Lady Aomori) (門世の柵)
  - One Piece
- 2024
  - The Great Wave off Kanagawa and Kitasato Shibasaburō
  - Grandpa and Grandma Turn Young Again
- 2025
  - Inakadate Village's 70-year miracle
  - Delicious School Lunch: School Trip of Flames (おいしい給食 炎の修学旅行)

== Production ==
Every April, the villagers meet and decide what to plant for the year. Prior to planting, farmers sketch out the designs on computers to figure out where and how to plant the rice. In 2007, 700 people helped plant rice. Agreements between landowners have allowed for larger pictures to be created.

== Advertising controversy ==
In 2008, it was planned to change the lower part of the field to include the logos of Japan Airlines and To-o Nippo, a local newspaper, for a reported 2 million yen to offset increased costs. The members of the local landowners' organization, along with the former mayor, protested, saying that the land would not be leased from the following year if the plan to display advertising logos was not abandoned. The village revitalization group voted by a narrow margin not to include the advertisements, and the seedlings that were planted were removed.

== See also ==
- Tamboāto Station, a railway station built specially to serve an area famous for rice paddy art in Inakadate, Aomori
- Hill figure
- Nazca Lines
- Crop circle
