= Fujin Sōgaku Jittai and Fujo Ninsō Juppin =

Series of woodblock prints by Kitagawa Utamaro

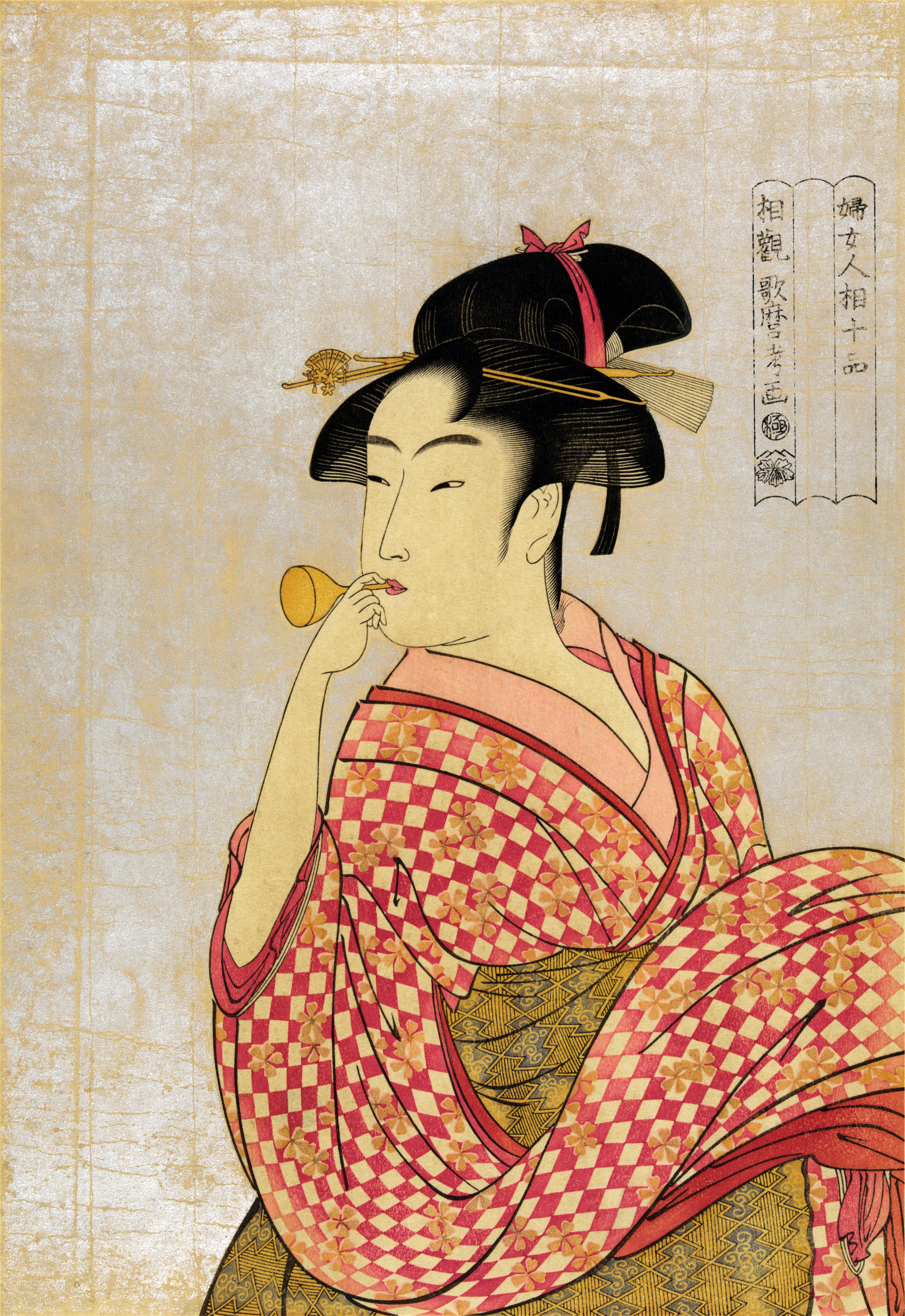
Popen o Fuku Musume ("Young woman blowing a poppen glass"), which appears under both series titles of c. 1792–93

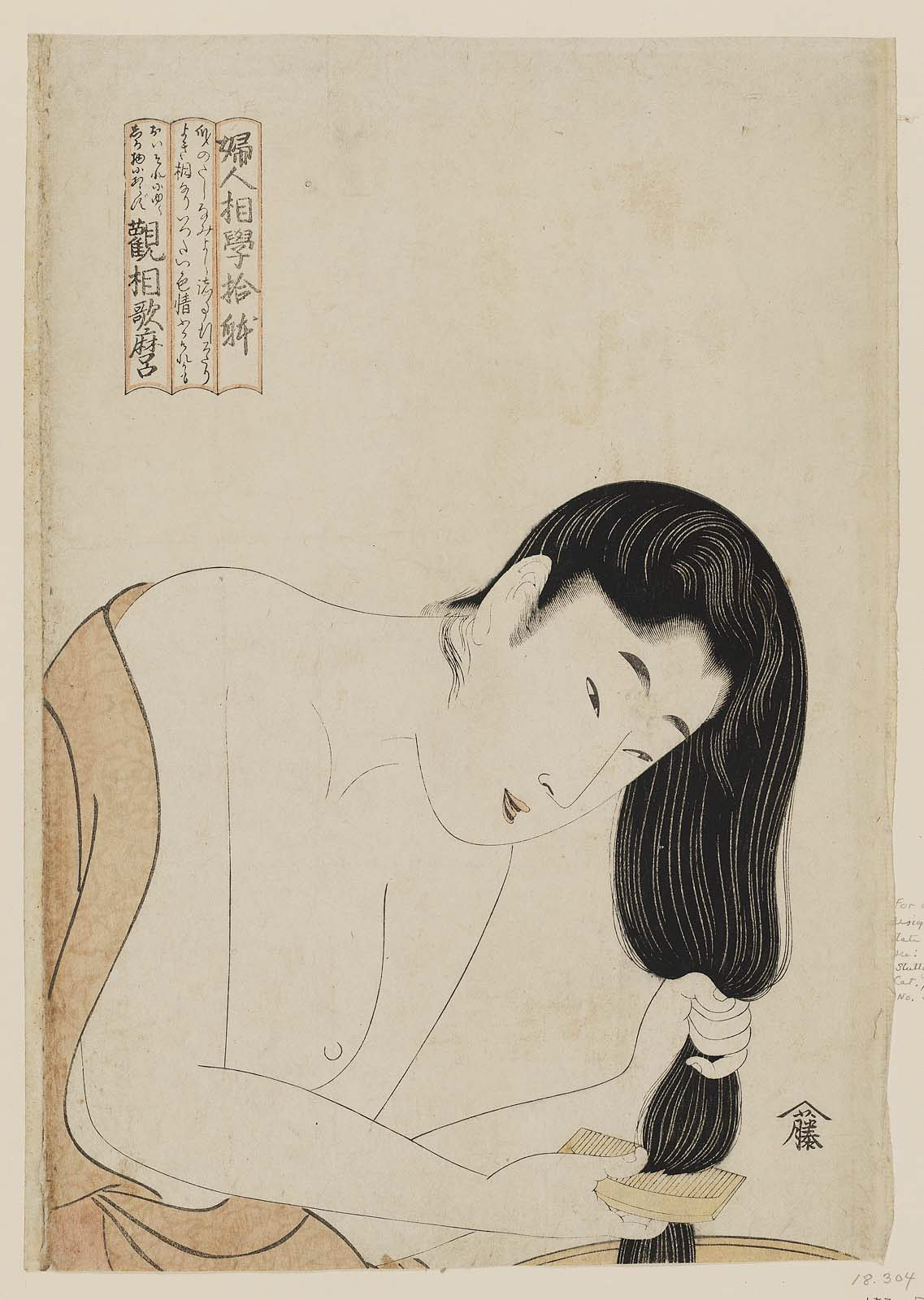
Kamisuki ("Combing the hair"), from the series of c. 1801–1804

Fujin Sōgaku Jittai (婦人相学十躰, "Ten physiognomies of women") and Fujo Ninsō Juppin (婦女人相十品, "Ten classes of women's physiognomy") are the titles of what may have been two series of ukiyo-e prints designed by the Japanese artist Utamaro and published c. 1792–93. Only five prints from one series and four from the other survive, and one print appears in both series, so that eight distinct prints are known. The two series may have been made up of the same prints, or they may have been the same series with a title change partway through publication.

Utamaro had another series published c. 1801–1804 titled Fujin Sōgaku Jittai (婦人相学拾躰). (Note: "拾" is an alternate Chinese character for "十"; both mean "ten" and are pronounced the same.) This series is made of different prints from the earlier one, and is known to have had all ten prints in the set published.

== Background ==
Ukiyo-e art flourished in Japan during the Edo period from the 17th to 19th centuries, and took as its primary subjects courtesans, kabuki actors, and others associated with the "floating world" lifestyle of the pleasure districts. Alongside paintings, mass-produced woodblock prints were a major form of the genre. In the mid-18th century full-colour nishiki-e prints became common, printed using a large number of woodblocks, one for each colour. A prominent genre was bijin-ga ("pictures of beauties"), which depicted most often courtesans and geisha at leisure, and promoted the entertainments of the pleasure districts.

Kitagawa Utamaro (c. 1753–1806) made his name in the 1790s with his bijin ōkubi-e ("large-headed pictures of beautiful women") portraits, focusing on the head and upper torso, a style others had previously employed in portraits of kabuki actors. Utamaro experimented with line, colour, and printing techniques to bring out subtle differences in the features, expressions, and backdrops of subjects from a wide variety of class and background. Utamaro's individuated beauties were in sharp contrast to the stereotyped, idealized images that had been the norm.

== c. 1792–93 series ==
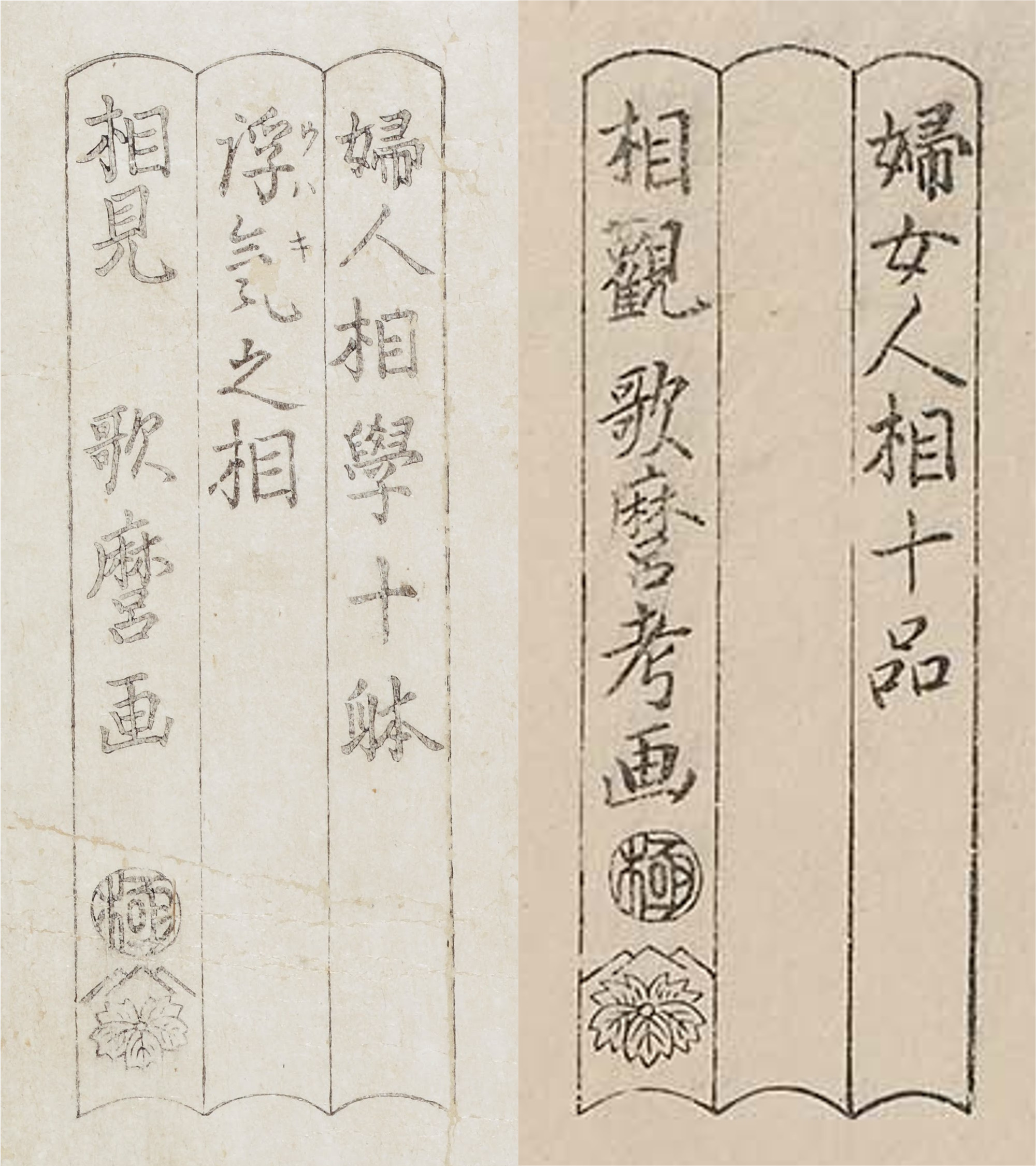
The rebuses in Fujo Ninsō Juppin include a print title (left); those of Fujin Sōgaku Jittai leave the same space blank (right).

The prints are ōkubi bijin-ga "large-head" bust portraits of female beauties in ōban-size (about 25 by 36 centimetres, 10 in × 14 in). They are amongst the earliest of Utamaro's ōkubi bijin-ga, and amongst the earliest of his works to use kirazuri—the application of mica dust to the backgrounds to create a glittering effect. The prints are considered some of the best representations of Utamaro's work. The multicolour nishiki-e prints were published c. 1792–93 by Tsutaya Jūzaburō.

The series titles declare ten prints in each set. Five are known from Fujin Sōgaku Jittai and four from Fujo Ninsō Juppin; the print Popen o Fuku Musume appears in both series, suggesting the two series may have been made up of the same prints. Each print has a rebus with spaces for the series title, the print title, and Utamaro's signature, which reads sōmi Utamaro ga (相見 歌麿考画 or 相観 歌麿考画, "drawn by Utamaro the physiognomist"), followed by the publisher's seal.

On the Fujo Ninsō Juppin prints Utamaro signs himself sōmi Utamaro kōga (相見 歌麿考画, "thoughtfully drawn by Utamaro the physiognomist"). Only Uwaki no Sō and Omoshiroki Sō have their titles on the prints; the rest have a blank space where the title would be. It is not known why, but has been speculated that the titles may have been removed after the first few in response to some complaint, and that perhaps further complaints led to a change in the title of the series as well, possibly over the use of the specialized term sōgaku.

It is assumed the words 相見 and 相観 are read sōmi and that they refer to a person who reads physionomies, thus the signature can translate as. This has to do with Sōgaku, a pseudoscience by which it was believed an analysis of facial features ("physignomy") could reveal personality traits. Texts were published at the time on these analyses. Utamaro's analyses were not based on these observations, but rather on allusions to other books, such as the illustrated story by Santō Kyōden of a prostitute disguised as a dancer, and an erotic book illustrated by Utamaro and Katsukawa Shunchō called Ehon Hime Hajime (会本妃女始, "Picture Book: First-Time Princesses", 1790), in which facial types are compared to the aspects of the sexual organs. Viewers likely were aware of the allusions of the prints to these books.

Eiji Yoshida recorded the title of another print in the Fujo Ninsō Juppin series, Kasō no Bijin no Hanshin Zu (下層の美人の半身図, "Half-length picture of lower-class beauty"), in the last volume of Ukiyo-e Jiten, but no details of its composition are known. Yoshida also noted that a catalogue from 1915 for the Yamanaka Shōkai trading company lists a Chawan o Noseta Chataku o Motsu Onna (茶碗をのせた茶托を持つ女, "Woman holding a saucer with a teacup on it") from the Fujin Sōgaku Jittai series. As these prints cannot be confirmed, there remains the possibility that the series remained unfinished after the publication of the eight known prints. Yoshida suggests there may really have been two series: Fujo Ninsō Juppin was left incomplete after five prints, and Fujin Sōgaku Jittai followed but was also left complete. Yoshida bases this assumption on the fact that, even if the series name had changed, there was no reason for Utamaro to change his signature from 相見 in the one to 相観 in the other (both read sōmi and have the same meaning).

=== Uwaki no Sō ===
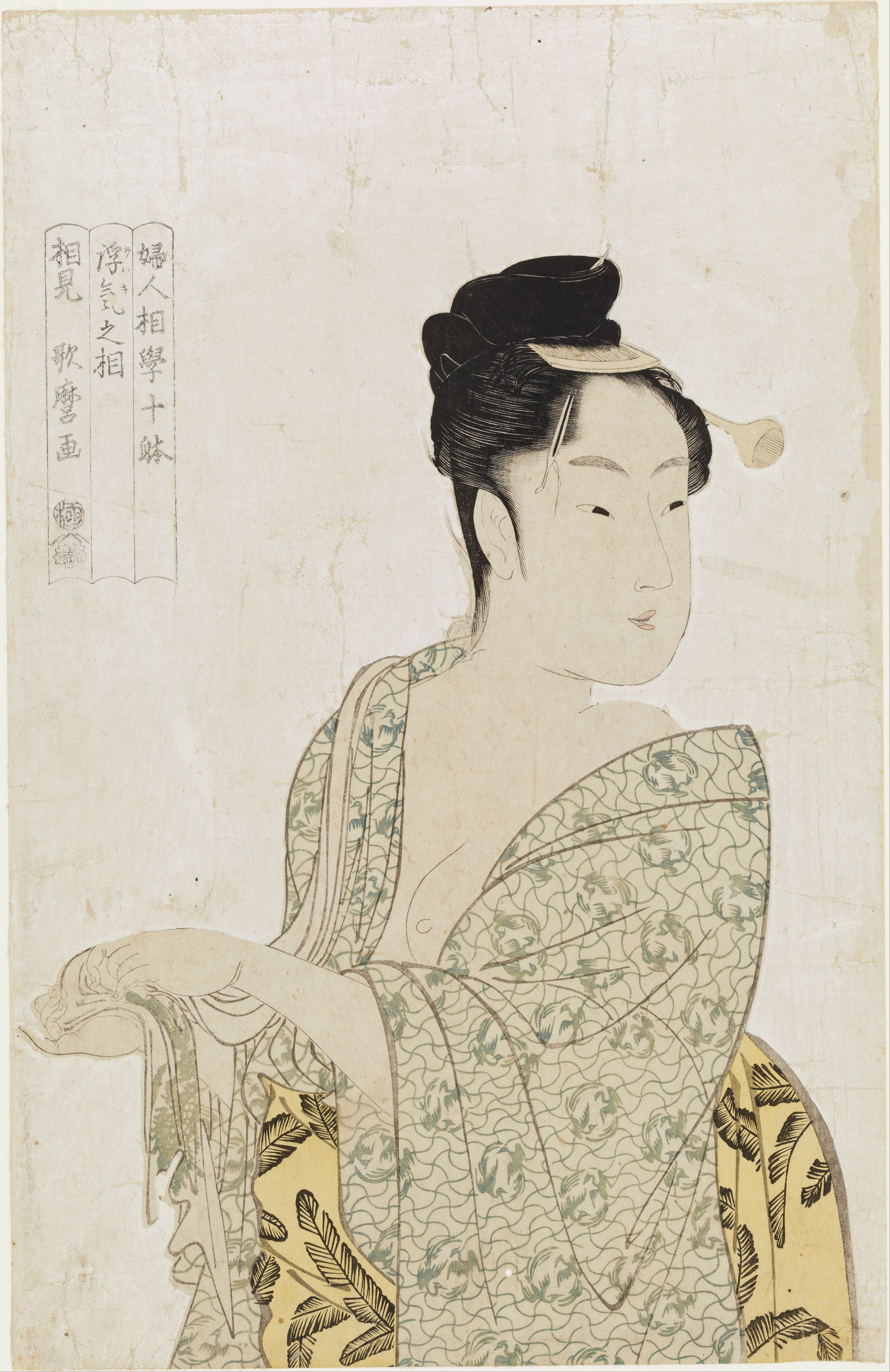

In Uwaki no Sō (浮気之相) a young woman—most likely in her 20s—is dressed carelessly in a yukata, with her head turned behind her, looking outside the picture. She is probably returning from a sentō bath. She wipes her hands with a cloth draped over her right shoulder.

In modern Japanese, uwaki usually means "sexual unfaithfulness"; less often it means "lively" or "frivolous", or indicates a showy disposition. In Utamaro's time the word referred to a flighty personality apt to follow fads and fashions.

The woman has a kanzashi hairpin and a comb placed casually in her hair. She has her mouth open slightly, as if she were about to speak, and has a seductive look in her eyes. The background is dusted with muscovite, a variety of mica, which produces a glittering effect. The vegetable pigments have faded from their original colours; the kimono was most likely a pale blue.

=== Omoshiroki Sō ===
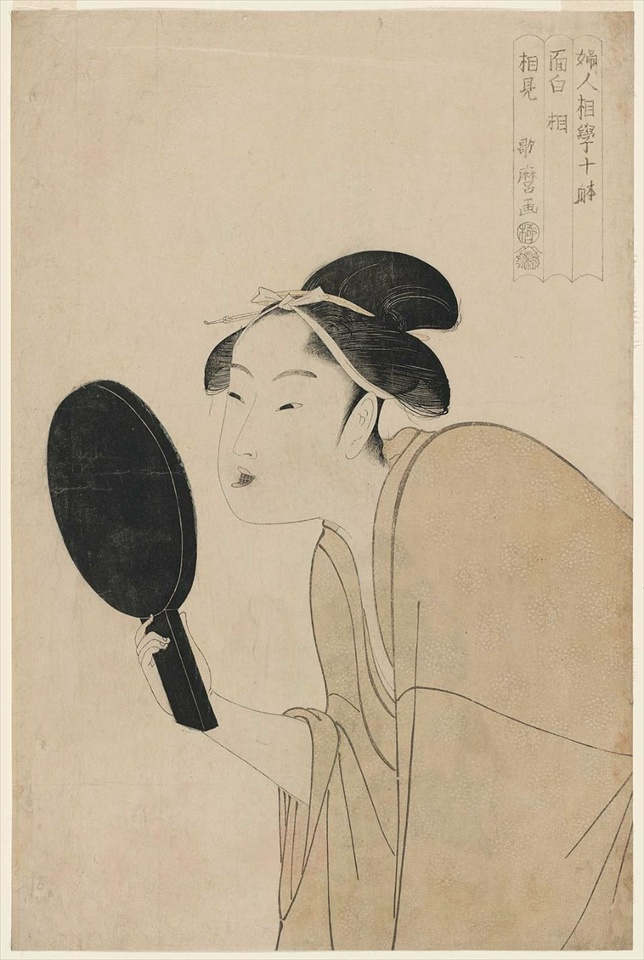

In Omoshiroki Sō (面白キ相, "The Interesting Type"), a woman looks in a mirror in her right hand. She examines her teeth, which have been blackened with ohaguro, which normally only married women applied. Women applying ohaguro are normally depicted with the mirror in the left hand and the ohaguro brush in the right.

Utamaro uses a limited number of colours in this print, which gives the impression of a dim interior scene.

=== Tabako no Kemuri o Fuku Onna ===
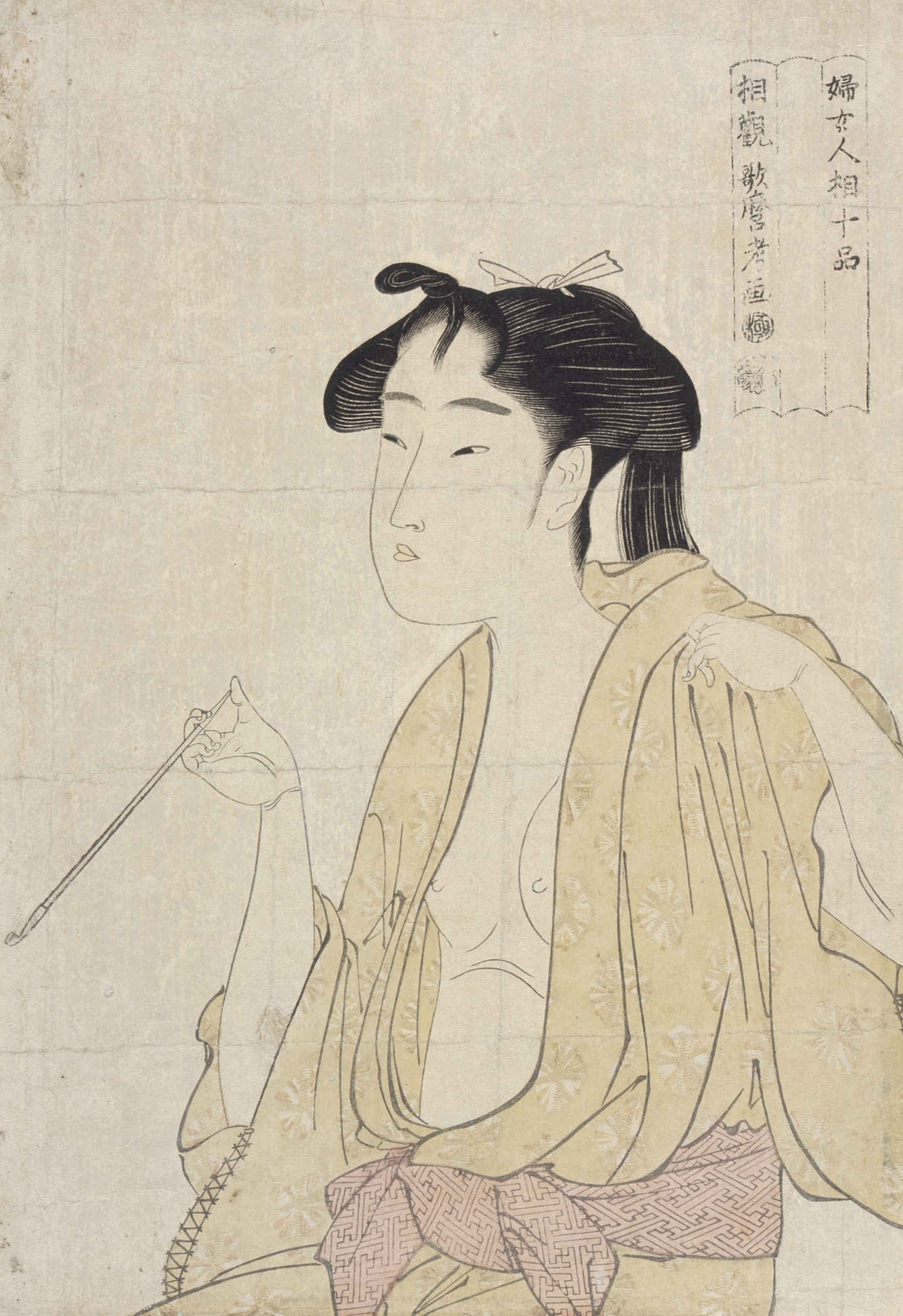

In Tabako no Kemuri o Fuku Onna (煙草の煙を吹く女, "Woman blowing tobacco smoke"), Utamaro depicts a young woman holding a kiseru tobacco pipe. She sits in a decadent posture with her kimono open, exposing her breasts, and her hair is coming untied. The pipe rests on her fourth and fifth fingers, with her thumb at the end on her index and middle finger holding it on top. She blows a puff of smoke rendered with karasuri embossing against the mica-dusted background.

=== Uchiwa o Sakasa ni Motsu Onna ===
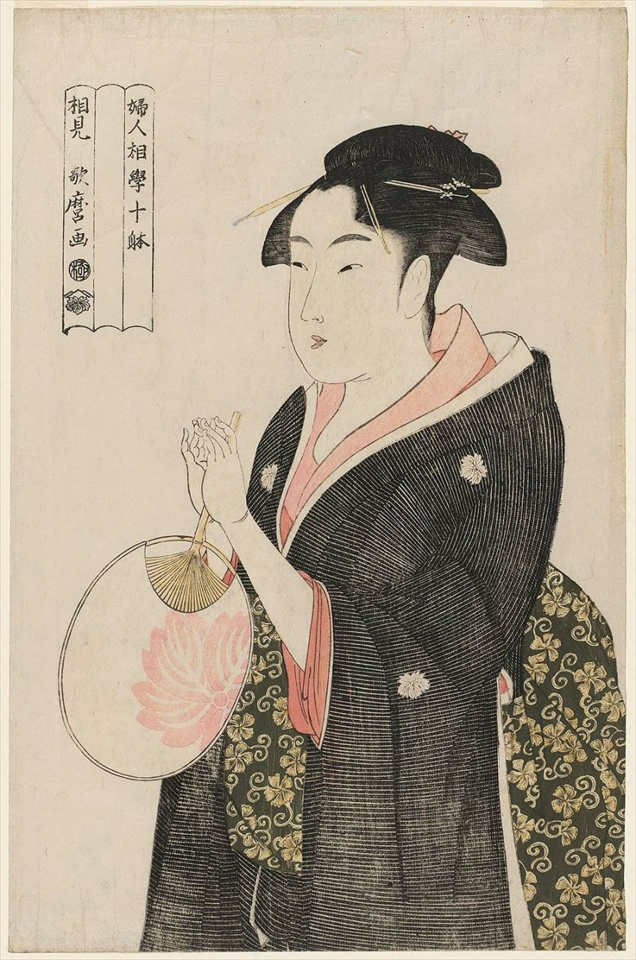

In Uchiwa o Sakasa ni Motsu Onna (団扇を逆さに持つ女, "Woman holding a hand-fan upside-down"), a young woman holds a round uchiwa hand fan upside-down with both hands, possible turning it in circles; she appears lost in thought.

A finely-patterned obi sash that wraps around her light, summer haori, a kimono-like jacket. The grey haori is of silk gauze, and its sleeves have slid down the woman's arms, revealing their white skin at the centre of the composition. Five-leafed ivy mon crests adorn the kimono, as well as a three-leafed ivy crest on the fan, signifying this is Naniwa O-Kita, (Note: The ivy crest was also associated with the kabuki actor Osagawa Tsuneyo.) a famed teahouse girl who appeared in many prints by Utamaro and others.

=== Yubi-ori Kazoeru Onna ===
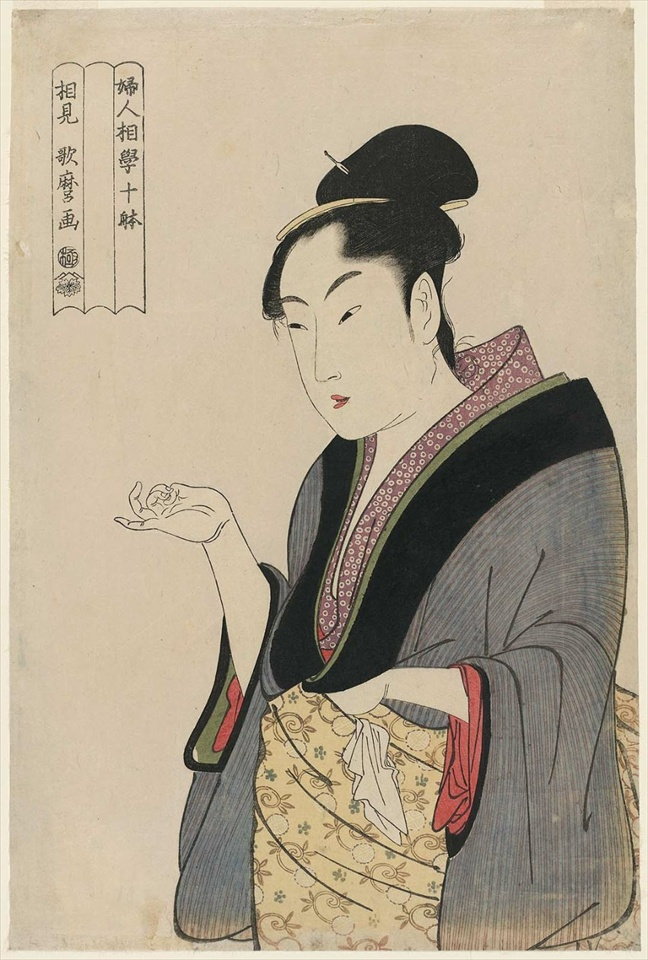

In Yubi-ori Kazoeru Onna (指折り数える女, "Woman counting with her fingers"), a woman counts something on the fingers of her right hand. Her left hand is on her obi sash, and her posture and facial expression suggest she is thinking seriously about something.

In Japanese yubi-ori kazoeru (指折り数える, "count by bending fingers") refers to a style of finger counting by which a person begins with the hand open and counts by folding inward first the thumb ("one"), then from the index finger to the baby finger.

=== Sensu o Mochi Higasa o Sasu Onna ===
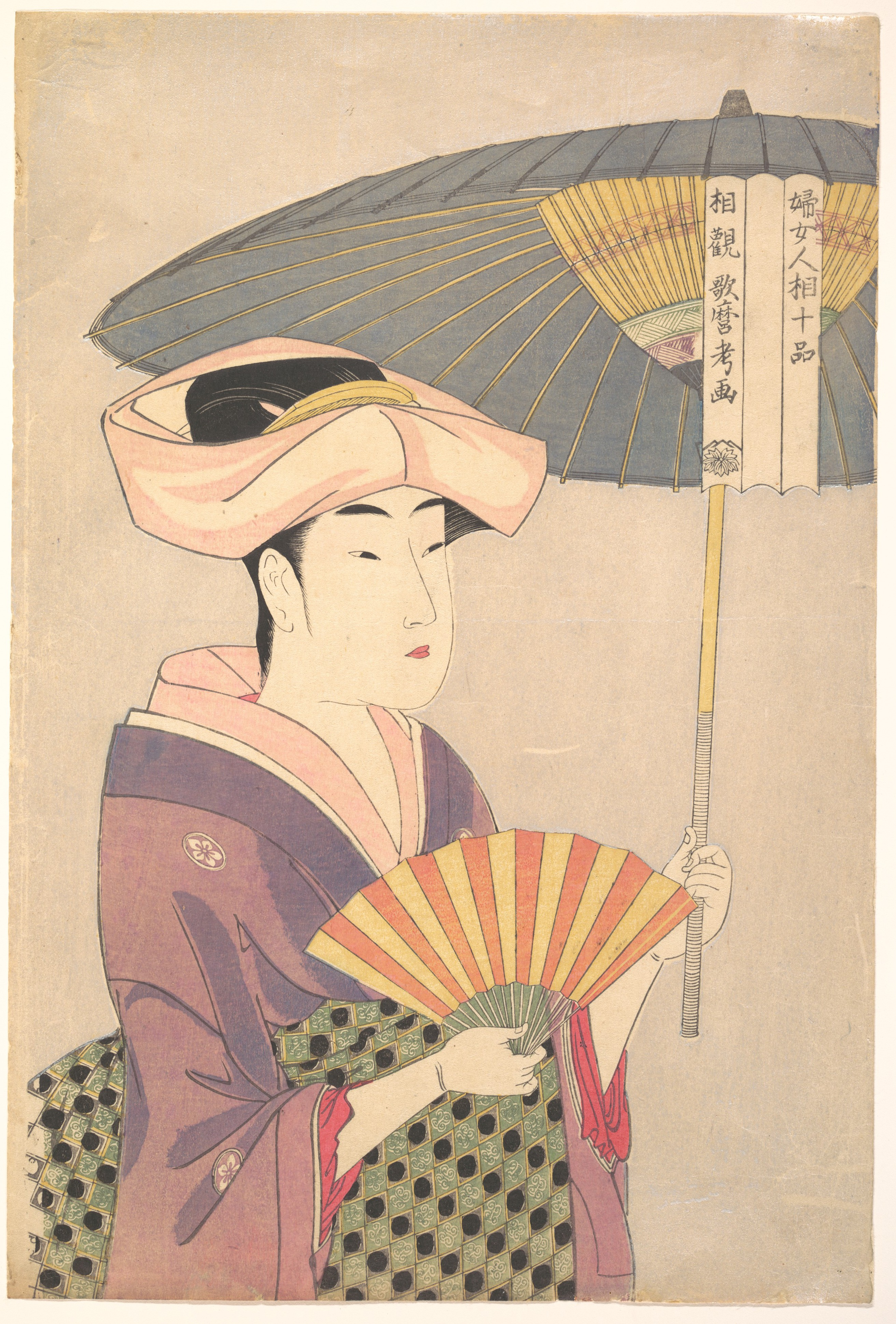

In the brightly-coloured Sensu o Mochi Higasa o Sasu Onna (扇子を持ち日傘をさす女, "Woman holding a hand-fan and parasol"), a woman stands in a leisurely, relaxed posture carryin a parasol and hand fan and wearing an age-bōshi (Note: 揚帽子 age-bōshi) head-dress to keep dirt from the hair. This was a popular summer fashion with women during the Kansei era.

=== Fumi Yomu Onna ===
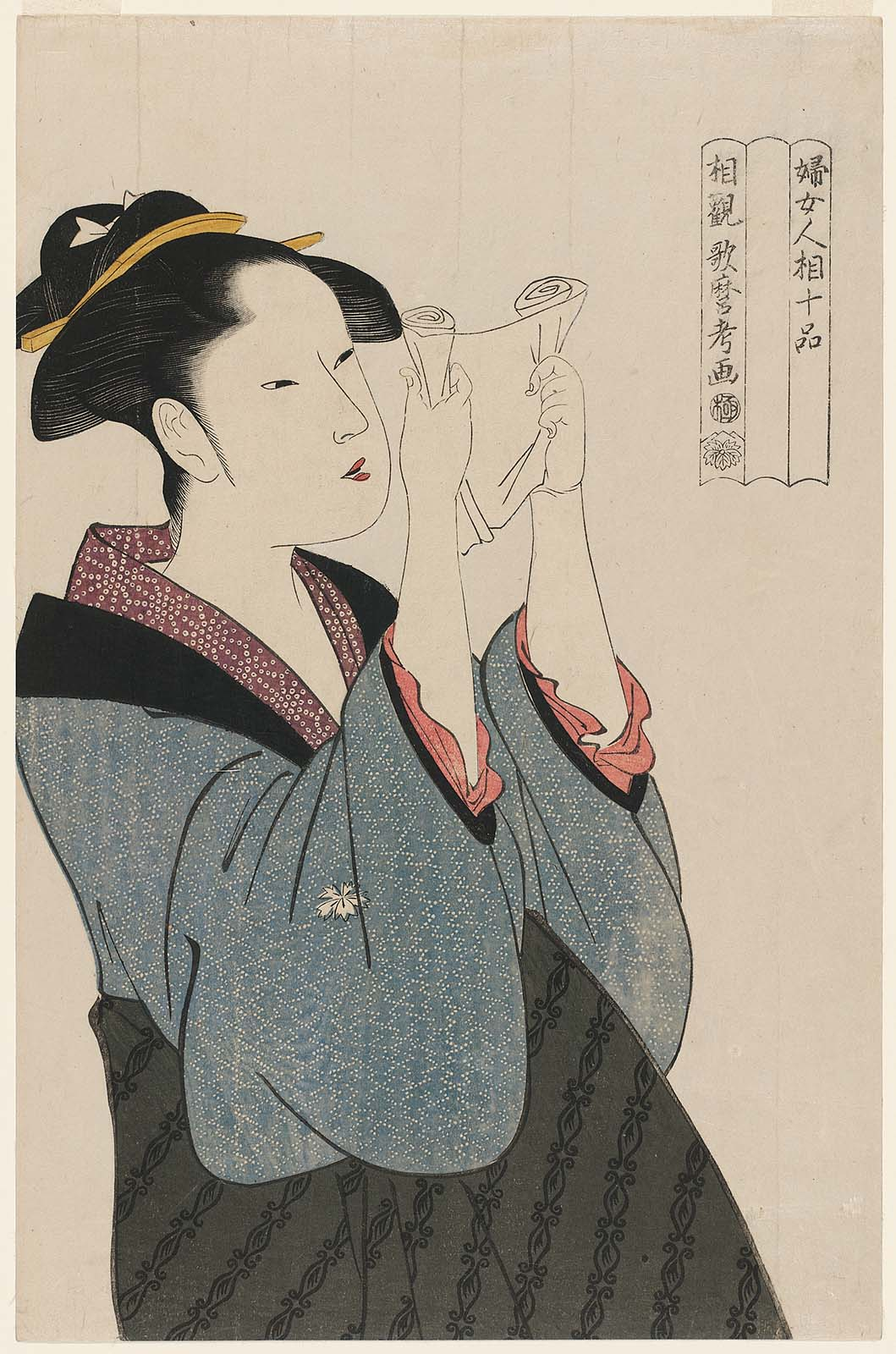

In Fumi Yomu Onna (文読む女, "Woman reading a letter"), a woman reads what is almost certainly a love letter, per the expectations in ukiyo-e. Expectations would also predict the recipient to be a courtesan or young girl, but the woman's shaven eyebrows and teeth blackened with ohaguro show that she is married. She holds the letter close to her eyes and probably reads it secretly and in low light. The arch in her posture and her squeezing grip on the letter suggest a conflicted emotional state brought on by a likely tangled relationship.

=== Popen o Fuku Musume ===
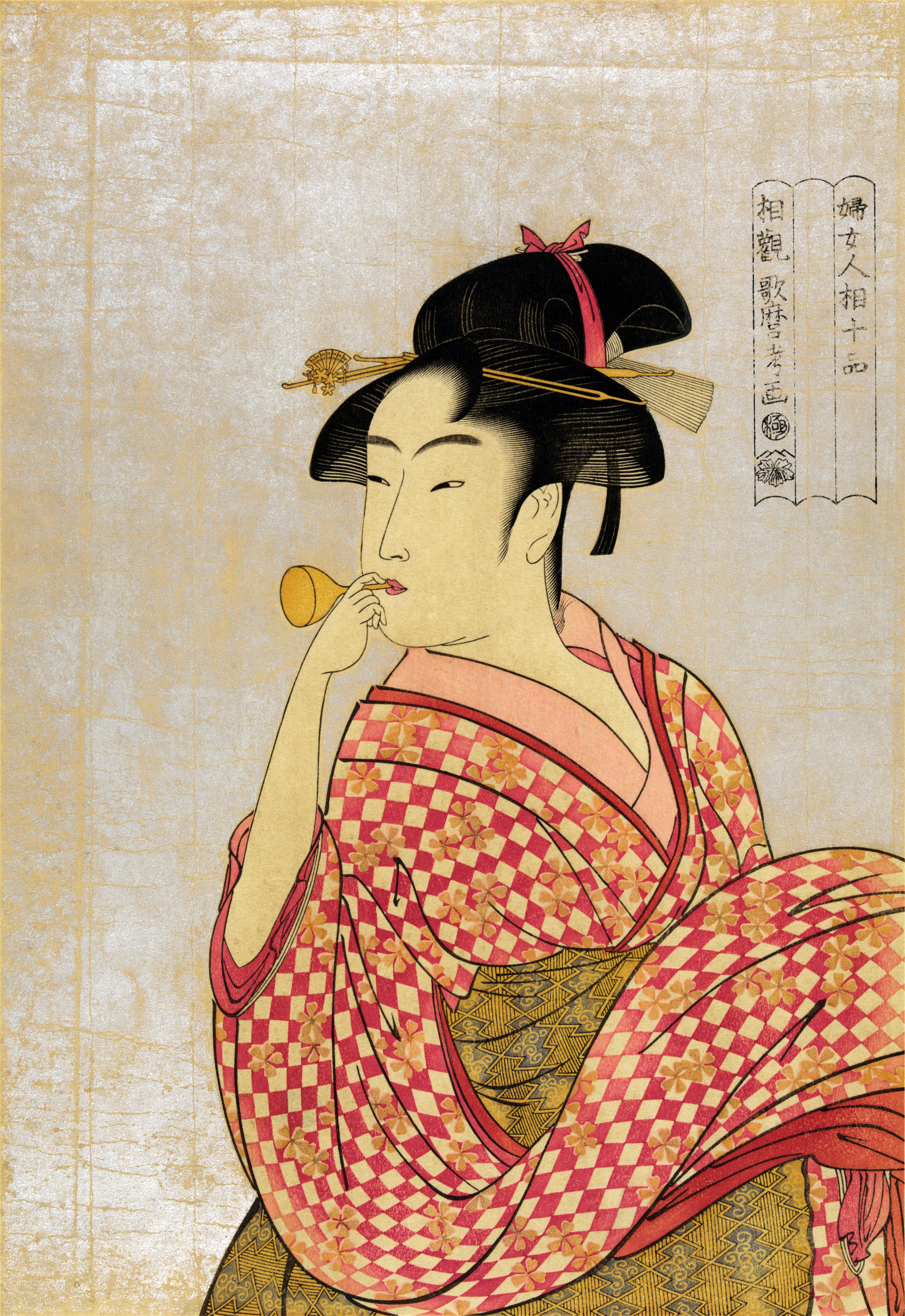

In Popen o Fuku Musume (ポペンを吹く娘, "Young woman blowing a poppen glass"), a young woman plays with a popen (Note: Known by many other names, including poppen, ponpin, and poppin)—a glass toy that changes sounds depending on whether the breath is blown or sucked through it; the change makes an onomatopoeic po–pen sound. It was an exotic type of toy a sheltered girl from a respectable family could have innocent fun with; she is likely the daughter of a wealthy merchant family. To Japanese art historian Tadashi Kobayshi, "Utamaro has marvelously captured her just when she seems about to achieve a more mature, voluptuous beauty but has yet to lose the innocence and naïveté of childhood.

The young woman wears a furisode—a type of kimono worn by young unmarried women. It has a design of scattered cherry blossoms over a red-and-white checkered pattern.

== c. 1801–1804 series ==
Late in his career, Utamaro had another series published in c. 1801–1804 titled Fujin Sōgaku Jittai (婦人相学拾躰). Whereas the older series appears to have been left incomplete, the latter series has a full ten prints. Each comes with a description in its rebus and is signed Kansō Utamaro (觀想歌麿, "Utamaro the Physiognomist").

The vertical ōban-size, full-colour nishiki-e prints were published by two firms: those of Tsuruya Kiemon and Yamashiroya Tōemon. (Note: 山城屋籐右衛門 Yamashiroya Tōemon) The prints issue by Yamashiro have a red outline around the title cartouche and bear his mark 籐.

The prints do not bear the titles listed below; they are provided by art historians, and sometimes differ, both in English and Japanese.

=== Chōchin wo Motsu Onna ===
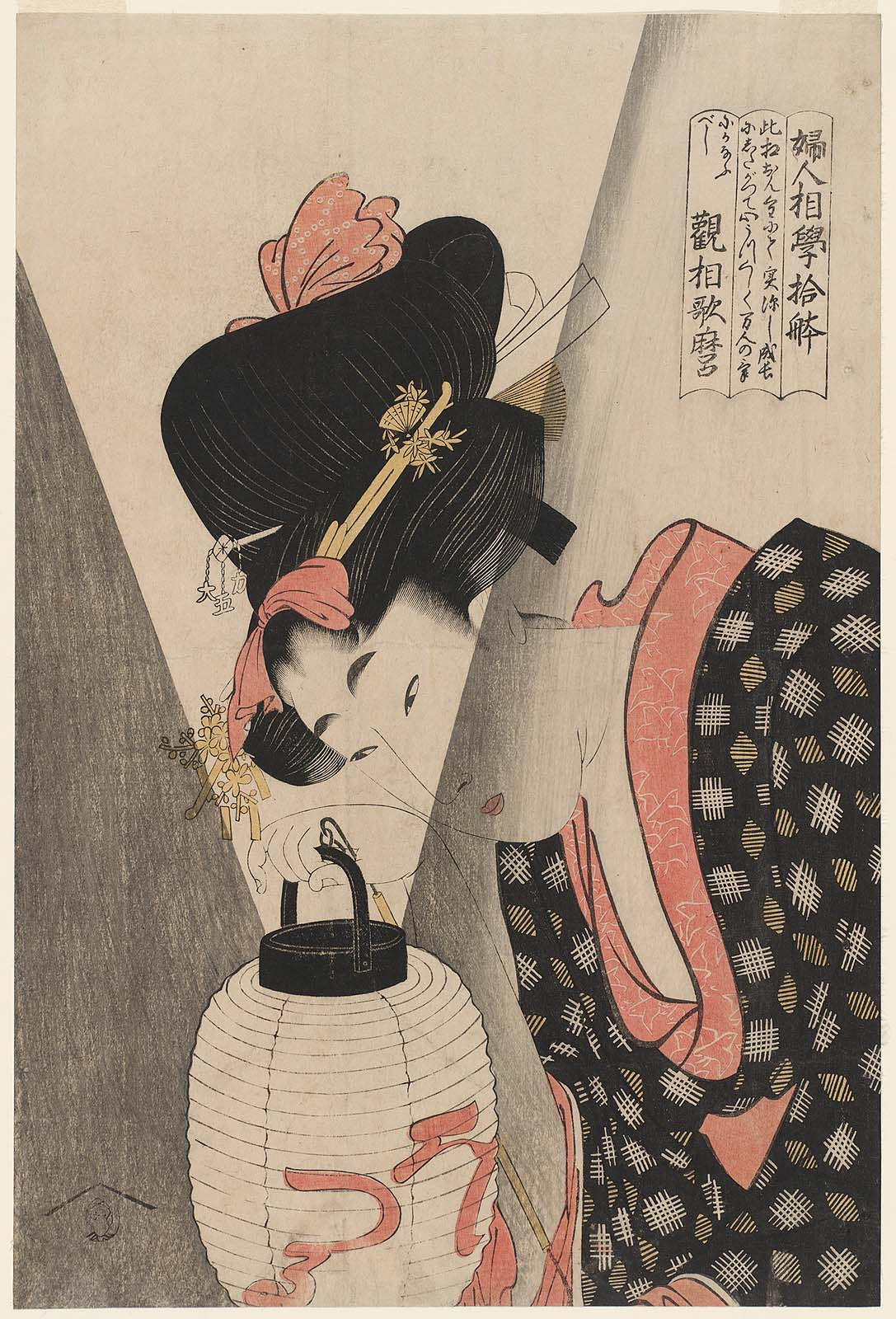

Chōchin wo Motsu Onna (提灯を持つ女, "Woman holding a paper lamp")

=== Kamisuki ===
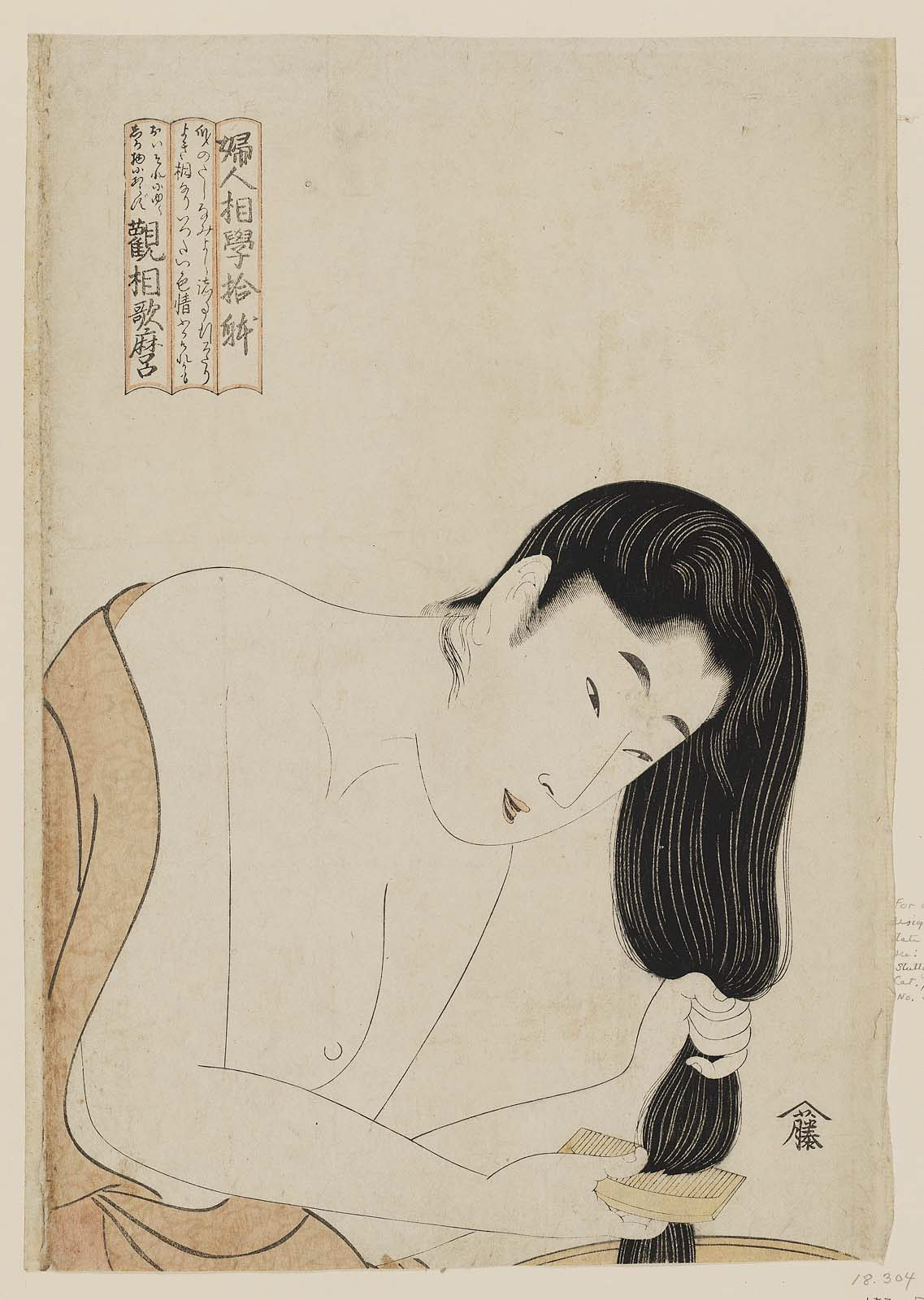

In Kamisuki (髪すき, "Combing the hair"), a woman washes and combs her hair over a washbasin. Her nude upper body is exposed. The inscription reads:

| Japanese text | Romanized Japanese | English translation |
|---|---|---|
| 婦人相学拾躰 身のたしなみよく諸事行わたりよき相なり いつたい色情ふかけれともおいそれにゆくしろ物にあらず | Fujin Sōgaku Juttai Mi no tashinami yoku, shoji ikiwatari, yoki so nari, ittai shikijō fukakeredomo, oisore ni yuku shiro mono ni arazu. | Ten Types in the Physiognomic Study of Women. She has a nice personal appearance and in all respects is a good type. In general her passions run deep, but she is no fool to let them run away with her. |

=== Kanetsuke ===
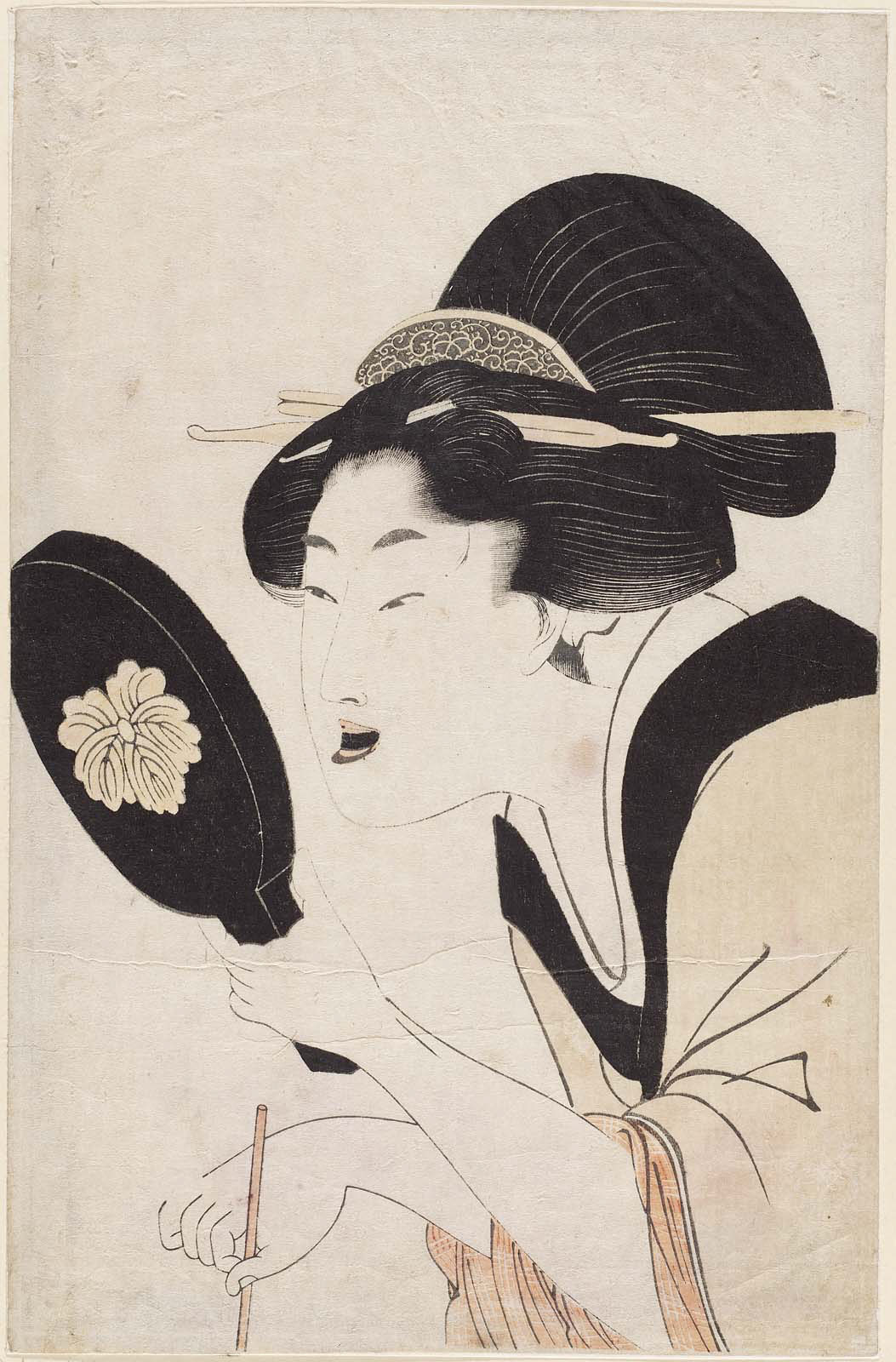

Kanetsuke (鉄漿付け, "Applying ohaguro")

=== Enkan wo Motsu Onna ===
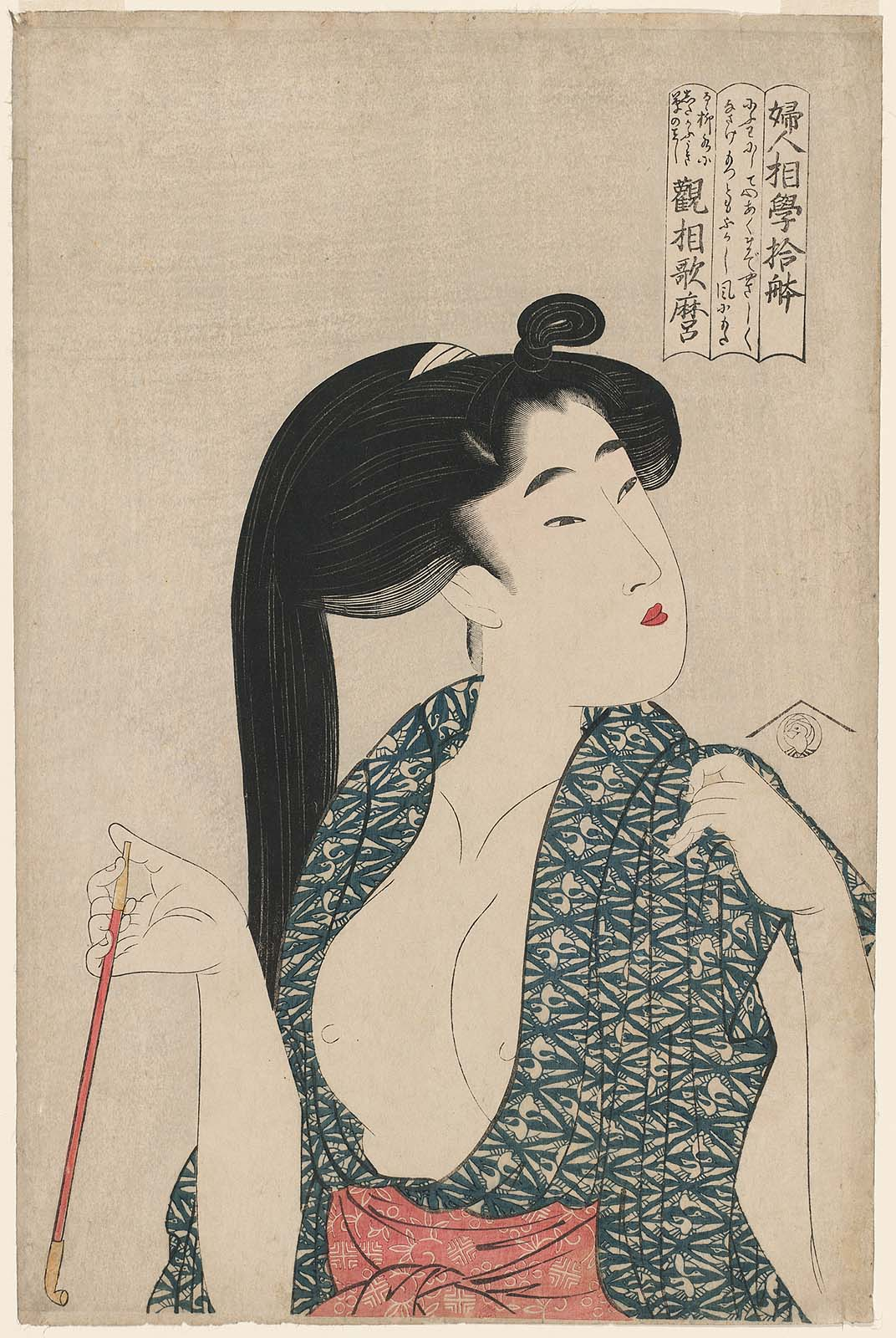

Enkan wo Motsu Onna (煙管を持つ女, "Woman holding a pipe")

=== Kazaguruma ===
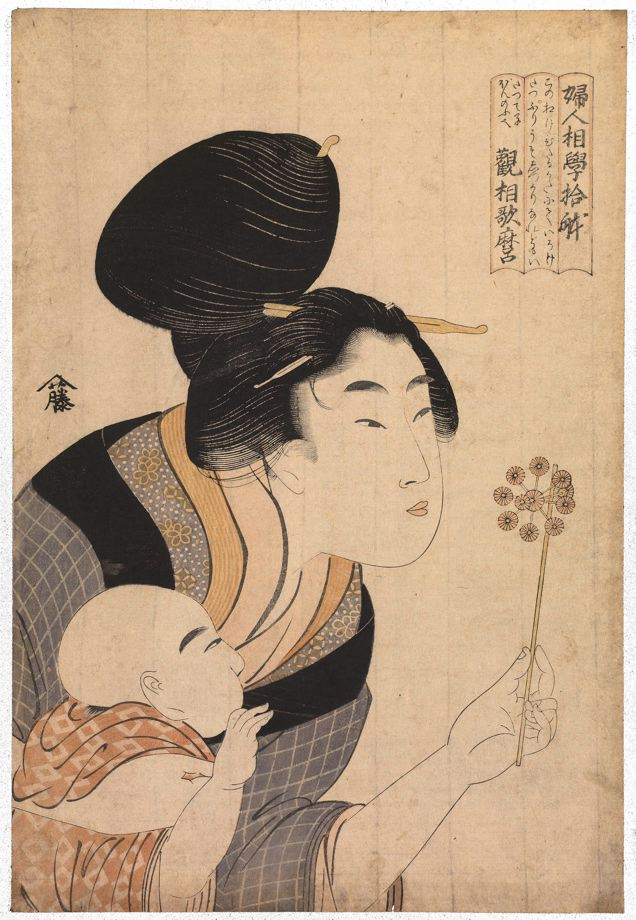

Kazaguruma (風車, "Pinwheel")

=== Mayusori ===
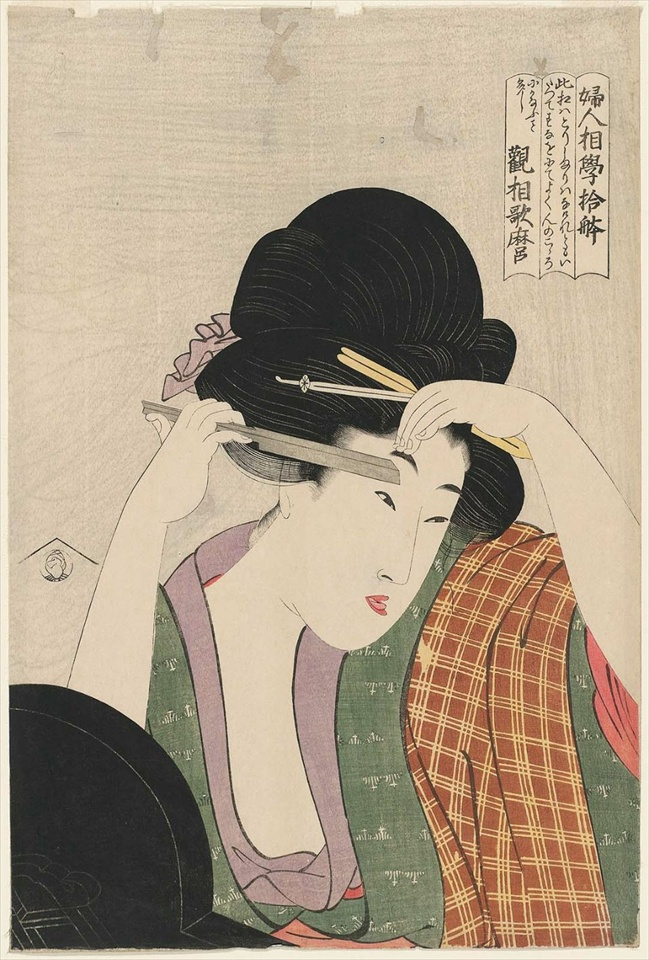

Mayusori (眉そり, "Shaving eyebrows")

=== Usu wo Hiku Onna ===
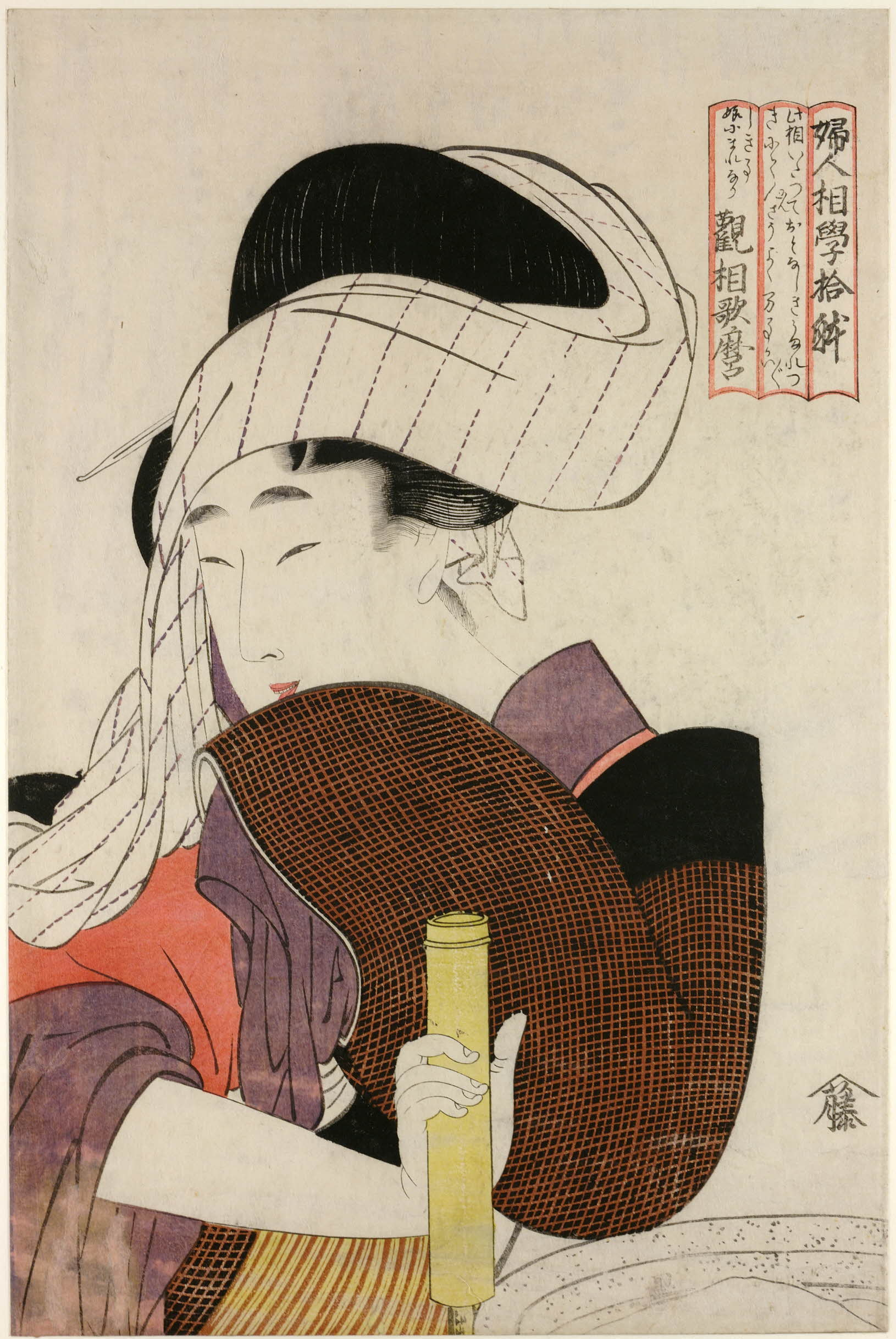

In Usu wo Hiku Onna (臼をひく女, "Woman grinding a mortar"), also called Hiki-usu (石臼, "stone mortar; millstone"), a woman with her hair wrapped in a towel works a millstone while laughing at something. The inscription reads:

| Japanese text | Romanized Japanese | English translation |
|---|---|---|
| 婦人相学拾躰 此相いたつておとなしきうまれつきにて 人さうよく万事かいがいしき事娘にまれなり | Fujin Sōgaku Juttai Kono sō ittate otonashiki umaretsuki nite, ninsō yoku banji kaigaishiki koto, musume ni mare nari. | Ten Types in the Physiognomic Study of Women. This is a very quiet type by nature. Her physiognomy is good and she is diligent in all things; something rare in a young woman. |

=== Nozoki-megane ===
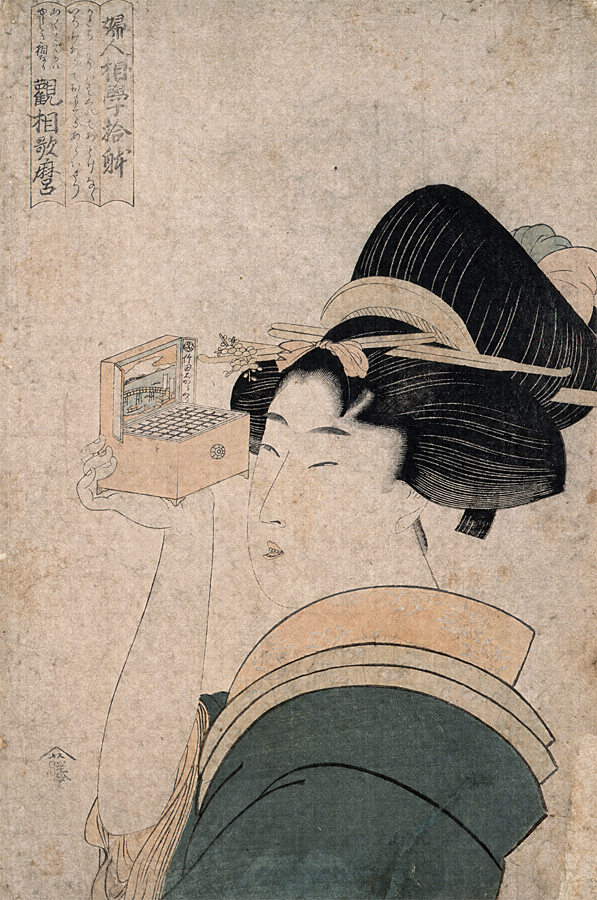

In Nozoki-megane (のぞき眼鏡, "Peep-box"), also called Kawayurashiki no sō (かはゆらしき相), a woman looks inside a magic lantern–like device. The inscription reads:

| Japanese text | Romanized Japanese | English translation |
|---|---|---|
| ......... | | Ten Types in the Physiognomic Study of Women. Far better than the exterior would suggest, and having a cute and kind exterior that does not appear on the surface, this is an incredibly delightful physiognomic type. |

=== Fumi-kakushi ===
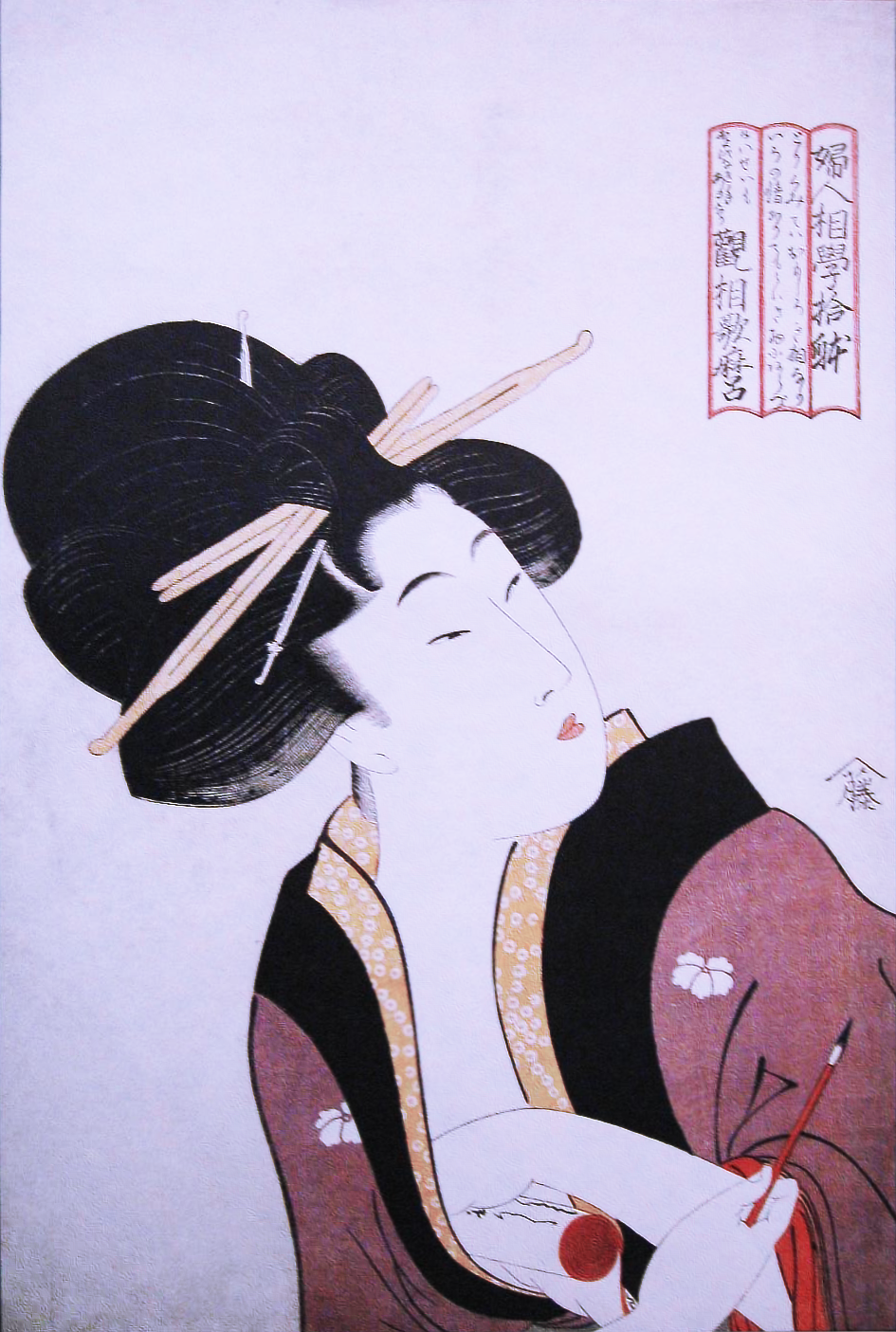

Fumi-kakushi (文隠し, "Hiding a letter")

=== Fumi-yomi ===
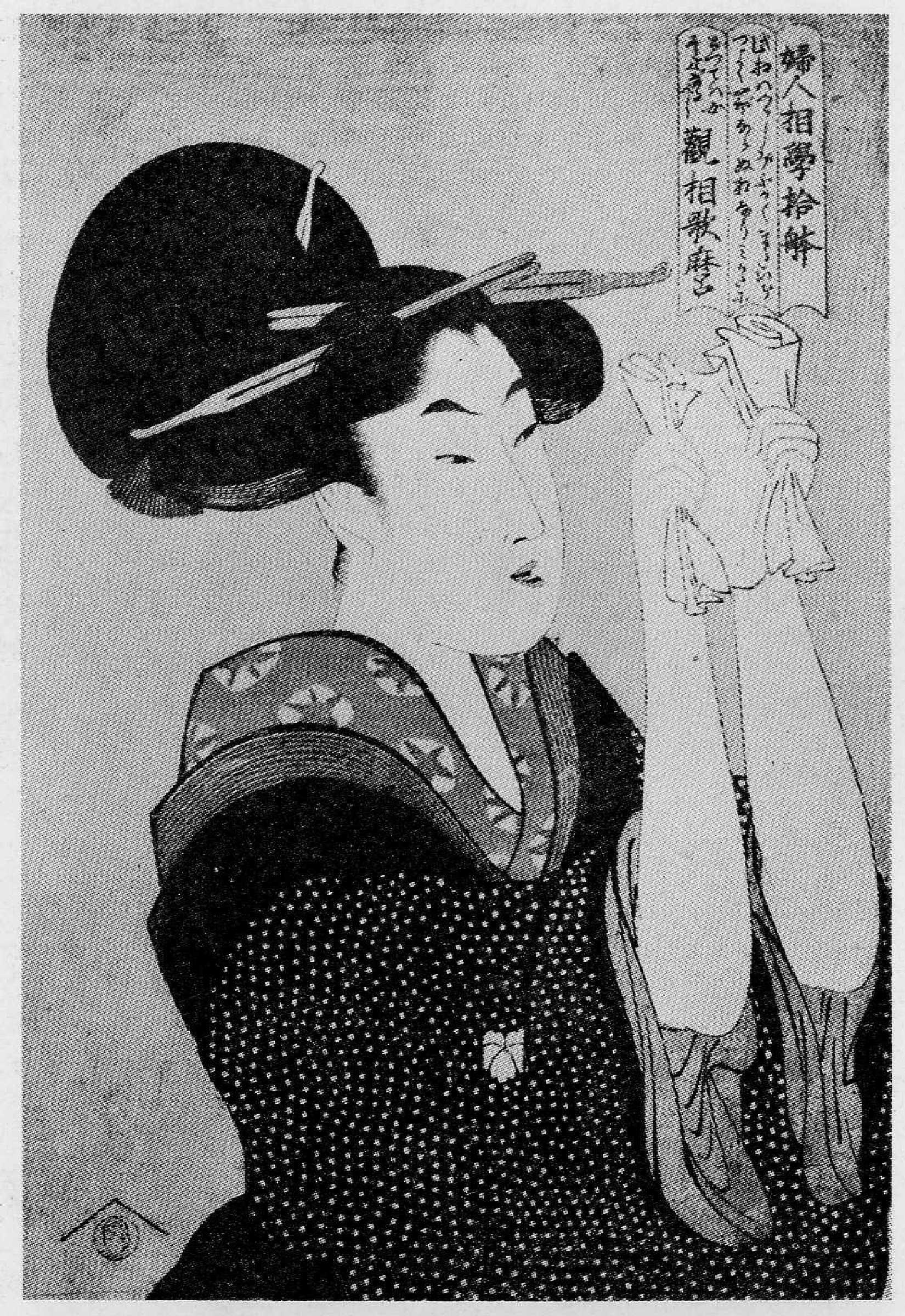

Fumi-yomi (文読み, "Reading a letter")
