= Tsutaya Jūzaburō =

Japanese publisher (1750–1797)

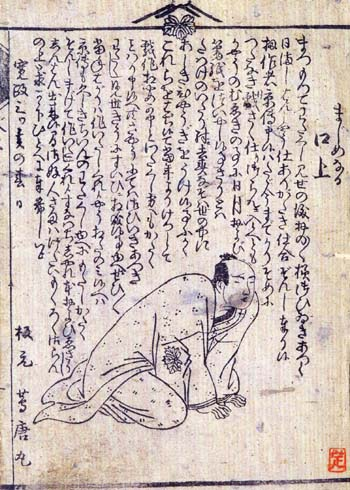
Preface from one of Tsutaya Juzaburo's earliest publications

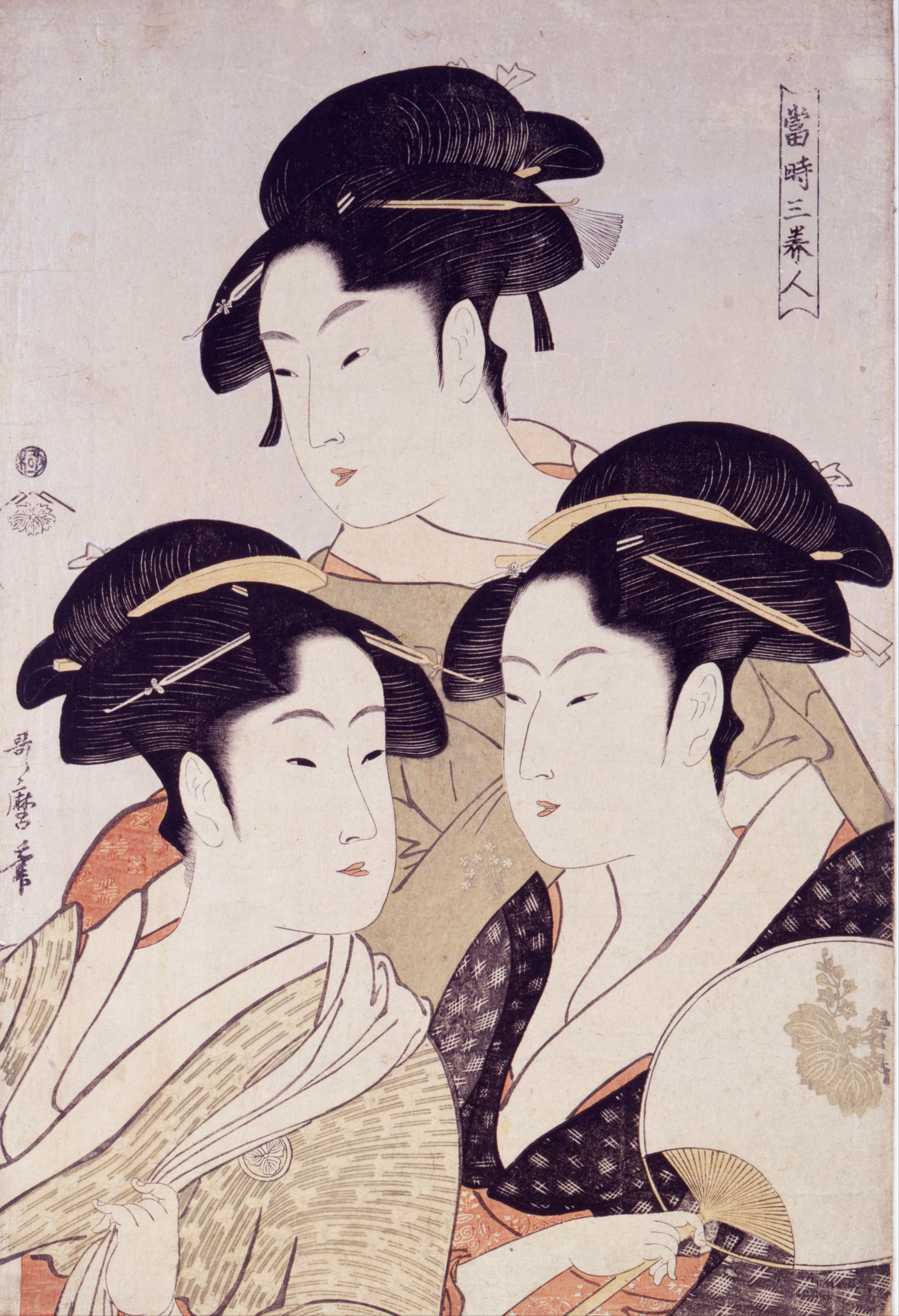
Toji san bijin (Three Beauties of the Present Day) From Bijin-ga (Pictures of Beautiful Women), published by Tsutaya Juzaburo

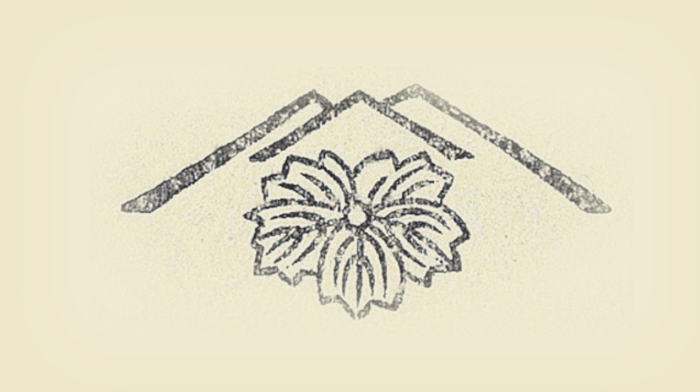
The publisher's seal of Tsutaya Jūzaburō

Tsutaya Jūzaburō (Japanese: 蔦屋 重三郎; 13 February 1750 – 31 May 1797) was a Japanese publisher who was the founder and head of the Tsutaya publishing house in Edo, Japan, and produced illustrated books and ukiyo-e woodblock prints of many of the period's most famous artists. Tsutaya's is the best-remembered name of all ukiyo-e publishers. He is also known as Tsuta-Jū and Jūzaburō I.

Tsutaya set up his shop in 1774 and began by publishing guides to the Yoshiwara pleasure quarters. By 1776 he was publishing print series, and went on to publish some of the best-known artists of the late 1700s. He is best remembered for his association with Utamaro and as the sole publisher of Sharaku. "Tsutaya" is not a true surname, but a yagō "shop name" that translates as "Ivy Shop". The publisher used a seal of ivy leaves under a stylized Mount Fuji as a publisher's mark.

== Life and career ==
Jūzaburō's father is believed to have been a member of the Maruyama clan and a worker in Yoshiwara, Edo's pleasure district. Born in Yoshiwara, Jūzaburō was adopted into the Kitagawa family and given the name "Tsutaya" after the shop name of one of the Kitagawa's tea houses.

Tsutaya opened his publishing business in Shinyoshiwara Gojukkendō Higashigawa in Edo in 1774 and began publishing with a volume of illustrations of Yoshiwara beauties by Kitao Shigemasa called Hitome Senbon ("Thousands at a Glance"); Tsutaya's other early publications were also guides to the pleasure quarters.

With the publisher Urokogataya, Tsutaya co-published the Yoshiwara Saiken ("Guide to Yoshiwara") from around 1774–75, and published it solo from 1776 to 1836 with illustrations by such artists as Katsukawa Shunshō. Also from 1776 Tsutaya began publishing books of haiku poetry, sharebon books, and ehon picture books, and with publisher Nishimura Yohachi, Tsutaya co-published his first print series in 1776: Koryūsai's Hinagata Wakana no Hatsumoyō ("Models for Fashion: New Designs as Fresh Young Leaves"). Tsutaya did not continue with the series, though, and Nishimura finished publishing it alone in 1781. In 1783, he began publishing kibyōshi by the famous writer Hōseidō Kisanji, marking the beginning of his popularity and success. He soon expanded into books of kyōka (comic waka poetry).

He moved his shop to Nihonbashi Tōriaburachō Minamigawa in 1783. The same year, he took over the publishing house of Maruya Kohei, and began publishing Utamaro the same year. Around this time, Utamaro moved into Tsutaya's own household, following the common practice among Edo publishers of living close to the Yoshiwara district; he lived with his hanmoto for about five years and became the principal artist of the Tsutaya workshop. Over the course of his career, Tsutaya discovered and supported artists and writers such as Utamaro, Sharaku, Bakin, Jippensha Ikku, and Santō Kyōden, producing thousands of prints based on the artists' designs, printing the writers' books, encouraging these creative talents, and serving as their patron and mentor. Though he enjoyed great contemporary success and profits for his publications, his fame today likely derives more from his ability to discover and nurture great talents. Without his efforts, many of the period's most famous and talented artists and writers may not have ever emerged.

The Kansei Reforms, instituted from 1787 to 1793, brought strict censorship and strict penalties. In 1791 Santō Kyōden was placed under house arrest in shackles, and Tsutaya was forced to pay a large monetary penalty for publishing his politically volatile works. For a period of ten months in 1794–1795, he printed and edited the entire work of the great artist Sharaku, to great contemporary success and profits. As Sharaku's identity remains a subject of debate, some scholars claim he and Jūzaburō may have been the same person, although this is unlikely.

Tsutaya died at the age of 48 in 1797. Some sources claim the cause to have been beriberi. His business continued under his chief clerk Yūsuke, who took on the name Jūzaburō II; production became sporadic from the 1810s, and appears to have ceased by the early 1850s.

== Legacy ==
Tsutaya is the best-remembered ukiyo-e print publisher, largely due to his promotion of Utamaro and as the sole publisher of Sharaku. Richard Lane called him "the greatest of the print publishers".

Tsutaya was well known for his kyōka poetry, which he wrote under the pseudonym Tsuta no Karamaru. He lodged writers and artists in his home, including Kyokutei Bakin, Santō Kyōden, and Utamaro, the last of whom still lived there at the time of Tsutaya's death. His portrait appeared in at least five books during his lifetime, and his shop appeared in 1799 in Hokusai's Ehon Azuma Asobi ("Picture Book of the Pleasure Spots of the Eastern Capital"). His work is held in the collection of the National Diet Library.

== See also ==
- Unbound, a TV series about the life of Jūzaburō.
