= Utamaro's pictures of abalone divers =

Japanese prints

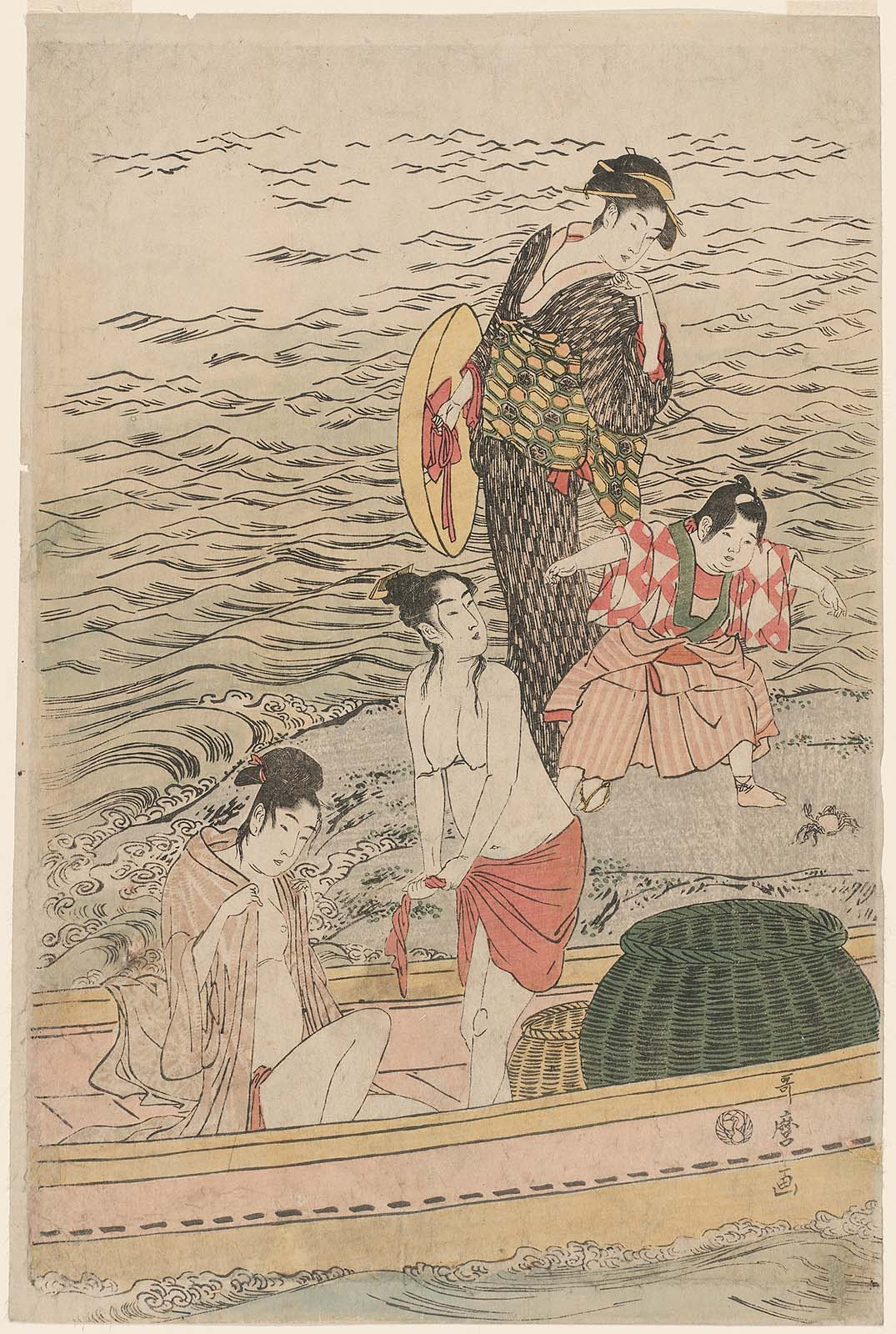
Leftmost print of Awabi-tori, Utamaro, c. 1788–90

The Japanese ukiyo-e artist Kitagawa Utamaro made a number of prints depicting ama divers—women whose work is to dive for shellfish or pearls—catching haliotis abalone sea snails.

Amongst the prints are the first print in the erotic book Utamakura (1788); two triptychs called Awabi-tori (鮑取り, "Abalone divers"), one from c. 1788–90 and the other from c. 1797–98; and the hexaptych Enoshima Yūryō Awabi-tori no Zu (江之嶋遊りょうあわびとりの図, "Abalone divers hunting in Enoshima") of c. 1804–06. Utamaro's heir Utamaro II published the triptych Enoshima Awabi-ryō no Zu (江之島鮑猟之図, "Catching abalone in Enomshima") in the early 19th century, signed Utamaro.

== Background ==
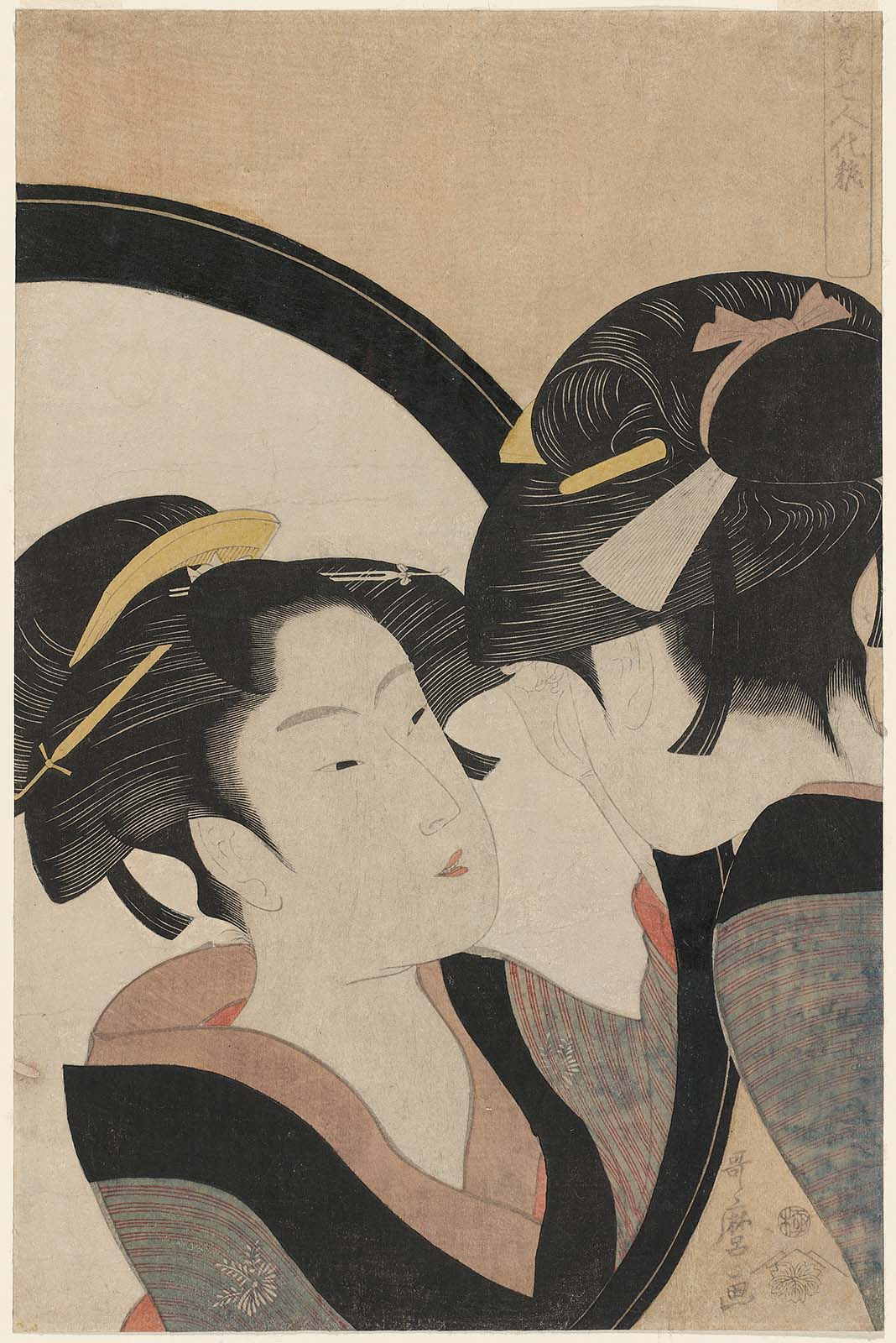
Sugatami Shichinin Keshō, Utamaro, c. 1792–93

Ukiyo-e art flourished in Japan during the Edo period from the 17th to 19th centuries, and took as its primary subjects courtesans, kabuki actors, and others associated with the "floating world" lifestyle of the pleasure districts. Alongside paintings, mass-produced woodblock prints were a major form of the genre. In the mid-18th century full-colour nishiki-e prints became common, printed using a large number of woodblocks, one for each colour. A prominent genre was bijin-ga ("pictures of beauties"), which depicted most often courtesans and geisha at leisure, and promoted the entertainments of the pleasure districts.

Kitagawa Utamaro (c. 1753–1806) made his name in the 1790s with his bijin ōkubi-e ("large-headed pictures of beautiful women") portraits, focusing on the head and upper torso. He experimented with line, colour, and printing techniques to bring out subtle differences in the features, expressions, and backdrops of subjects from a wide variety of class and background. Utamaro's individuated beauties were in sharp contrast to the stereotyped, idealized images that had been the norm.

=== Ama ===
Ama divers have for two thousand years practised their trade of diving for shellfish, seaweed, and pearls off the coasts of Japan. Traditionally they dive naked except for a waistcloth and a cord with one end above the water. They also carry a knife to pry open shells. Ama once numbered many thousands, (Note: Peaking at 13000 in 1921) but by the beginning of the 21st century only about a thousand remained. Though depicted in their youth in ukiyo-e pictures, the ama was a lifetime job that continued into the woman's fifties.

Ama were known for their coarse manners, and their work coarsened their skin. This was in great contrast to the geishas and courtesans who were normally the subject of ukiyo-e art—their manners were refined, they dressed elegantly, they immersed themselves in high art and culture, and they commanded high prices for their services. The ama were perceived as less feminine, but socially and sexually free. Utamaro and others played with these contrasts, portraying ama in elegant, resting poses as they often did with geisha, but nude and unkempt in their work environment. While Utamaro's supple, energetic, and vigorously healthy ama come across in a way erotic, his depictions of them differ from his often sexually explicit shunga. It has been speculated such prints of women who appeared nude in broad daylight may have arisen in reaction to government suppression of shunga.

== Utamakura print No. 1 ==
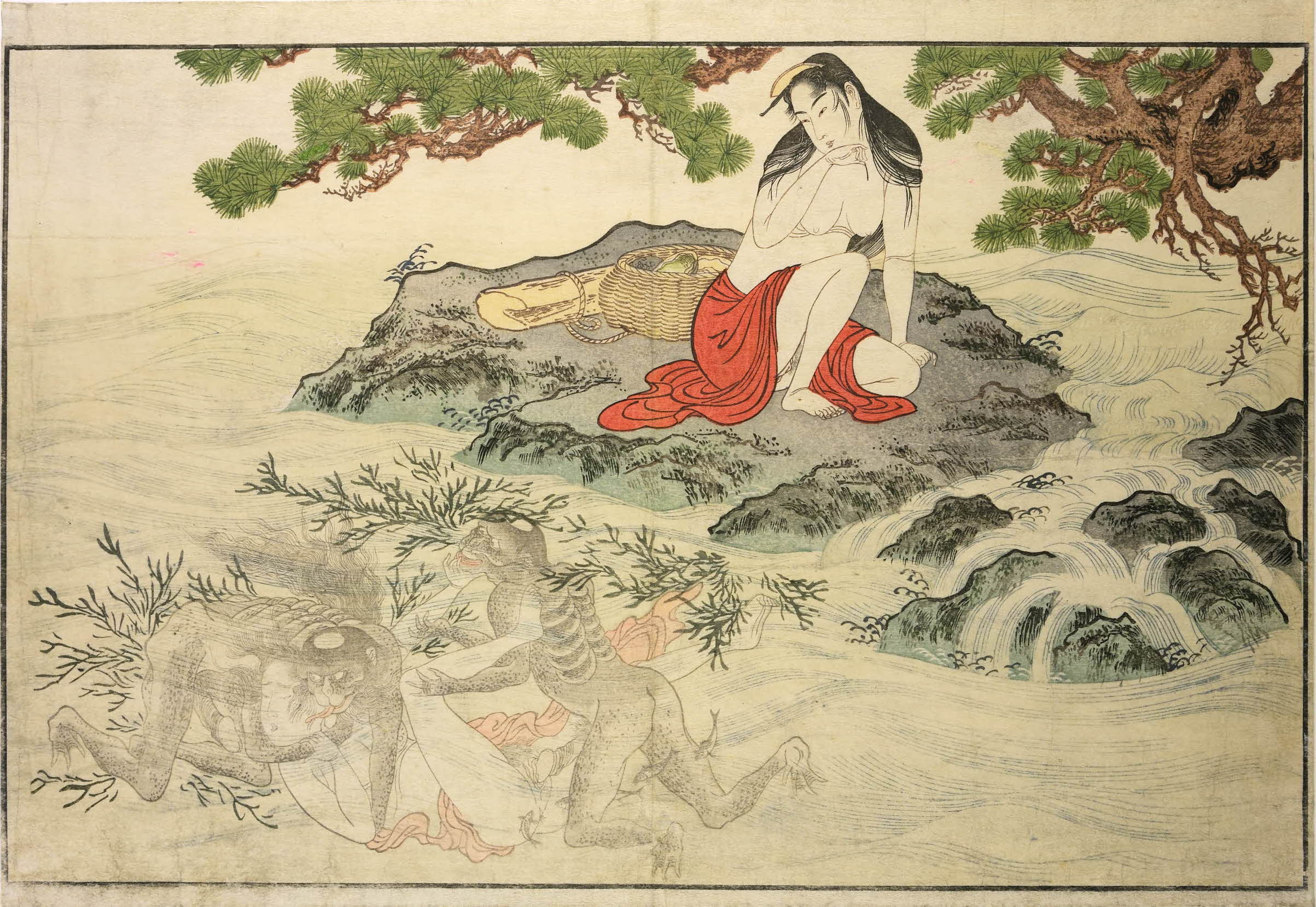

Utamakura (歌まくら, "poem[s] of the pillow") is a book of 12 erotic prints attributed to Utamaro, published in 1788.

The first print depicts a pair of kappa river creatures raping an ama diver underwater. Her hair flows with the running current, and small, seemingly curious fish swim near. Another ama watches seated on a rock with an ashamed look, her right hand held to her mouth. Her drenched, dishevelled hair sticks to her. She wears a red waistcloth, but her genitals can still be seen. To the French art critic Edmond de Goncourt she "appear[s] languid and susceptible to temptation.

Utamaro employs a varied contrast of tones in the area of the rocks, while fine lines of the running current partially obscure the underwater scene. Careful attention goes to the individual strands of the women's hair. The amas in this picture demonstrate the manner in which he depicted them in future prints.

== Awabi-tori (c. 1788–90) ==
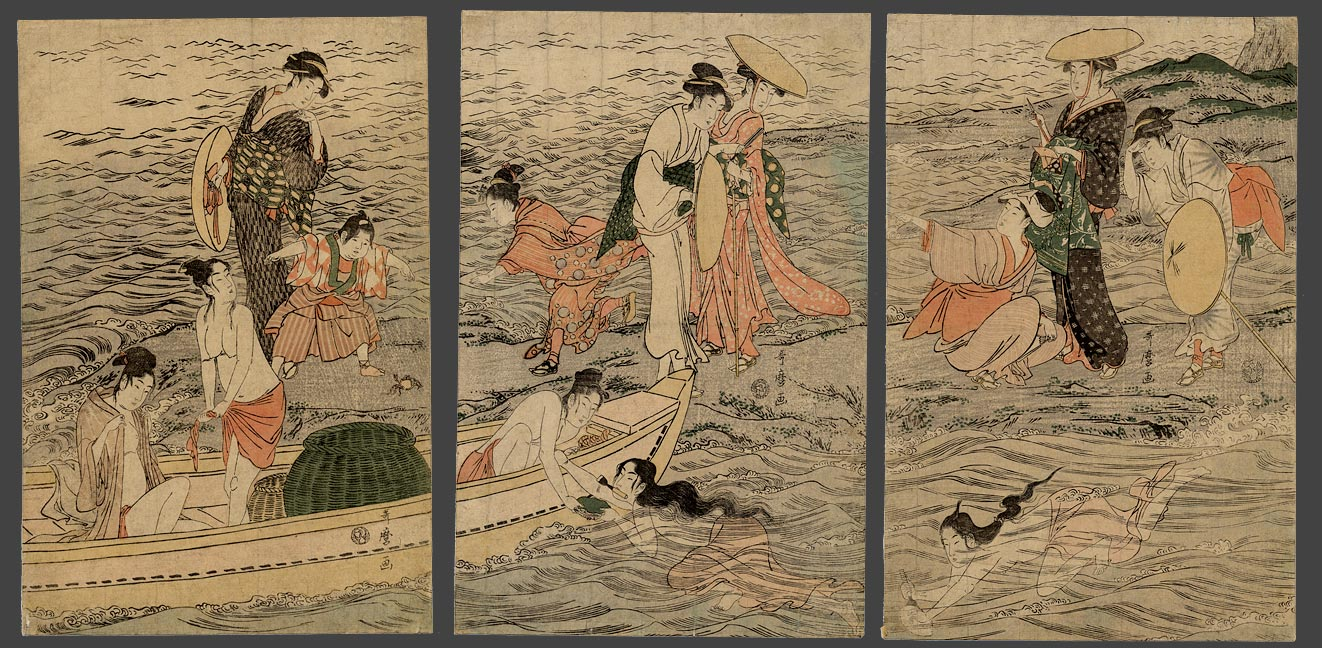
Awabi-tori, Utamaro, colour woodblock print on handmade washi paper, 39 by 26 centimetres (15 in × 10 in), c. 1788–90

Three vertical ōban prints of about 39 by 26 centimetres (15 in × 10 in) each make up the first Awabi-tori triptych. They are signed Utamaro ga (哥麿画, "picture by Utamaro") and were published c. 1788–90 by Tsuruya Kiemon's (Note: 鶴屋 喜右衛門 Tsuruya Kiemon) firm Senkakudō. (Note: 僊鶴堂 Senkakudō)

The scene depicts a group of women on a rocky shore watching ama divers. In a boat to the left, two women undress while another in the central print helps a swimming colleague. Another swimming ama appears in the right print. The swimmers appear small and thin, their bodies enveloped in their wet hair. The French art critic Edmond de Goncourt compares these firgure to traditional Japanese representations of "dead souls coming to haunt the earth".

The rocks appear to be Manaita-iwa (俎岩, "Chopping-block Rocks") in Enoshima in what is now Kanagawa Prefecture. In that case, the women on the rocks are likely pilgrims on their way to Enoshima Shrine to worship the deity Benten. The shrine displayed its treasures every six years; one of these displays was in 1791, and Utamaro may have produced this image about 1790 in anticipation of the event.

== Awabi-tori (c. 1797–98) ==
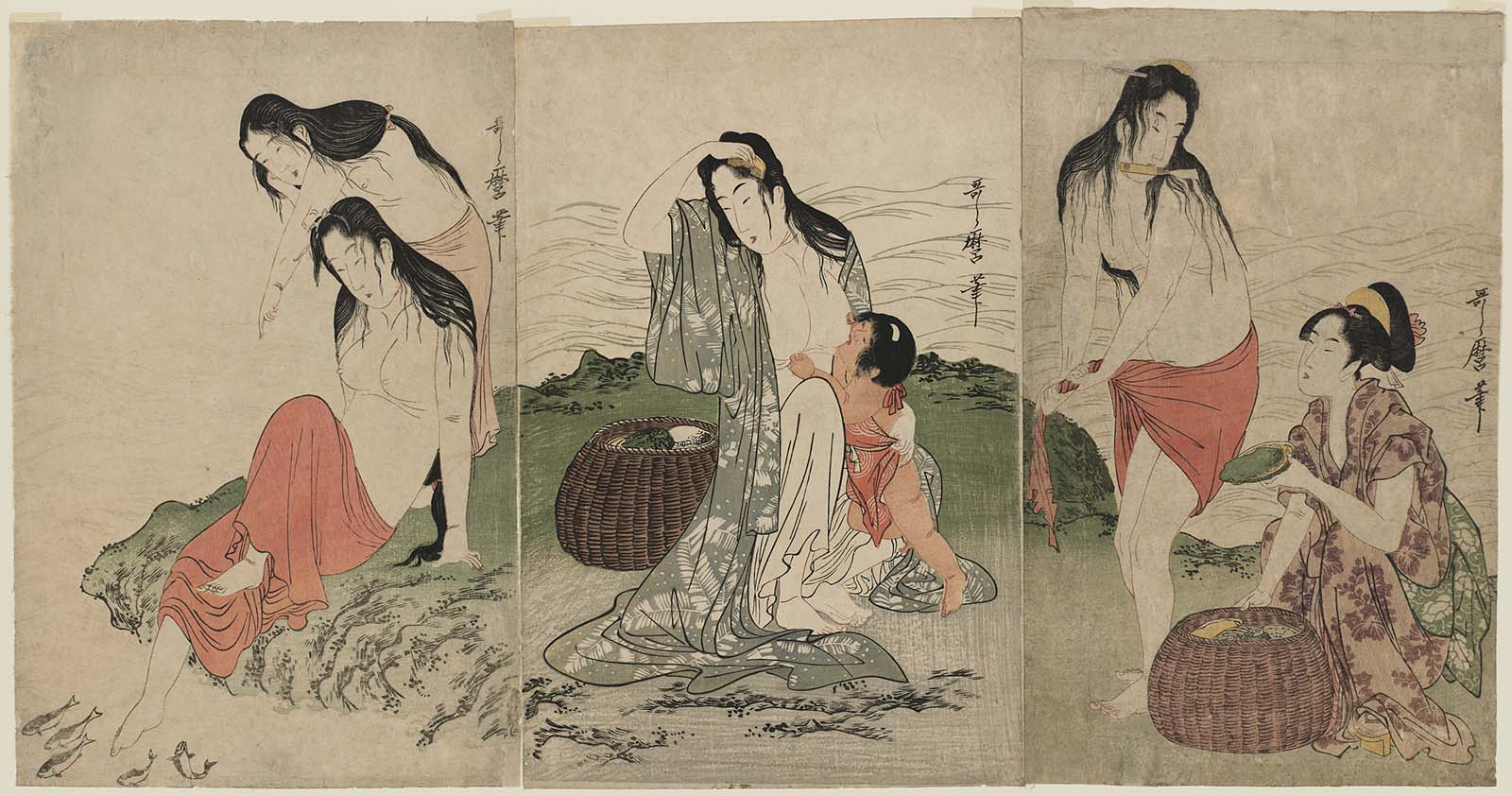
Awabi-tori, Utamaro, c. 1797–98, coloured pigment on hand-made washi paper, 38 by 25 centimetres (15 in × 10 in)

The three prints make up a triptych when placed together. The prints are nishiki-e "brocade prints"—multicolour woodblock prints made with pigments on hand-made washi paper. They are in ōban size, each about 38 by 25 centimetres (15 in × 10 in). They were published c. 1797–98. Each sheet is signed Utamaro hitsu (哥麿筆, "the brush of Utamaro"). The publisher is unknown, and there is no censor's seal, which has raised speculation as to how acceptable what the picture depicts was at the time.

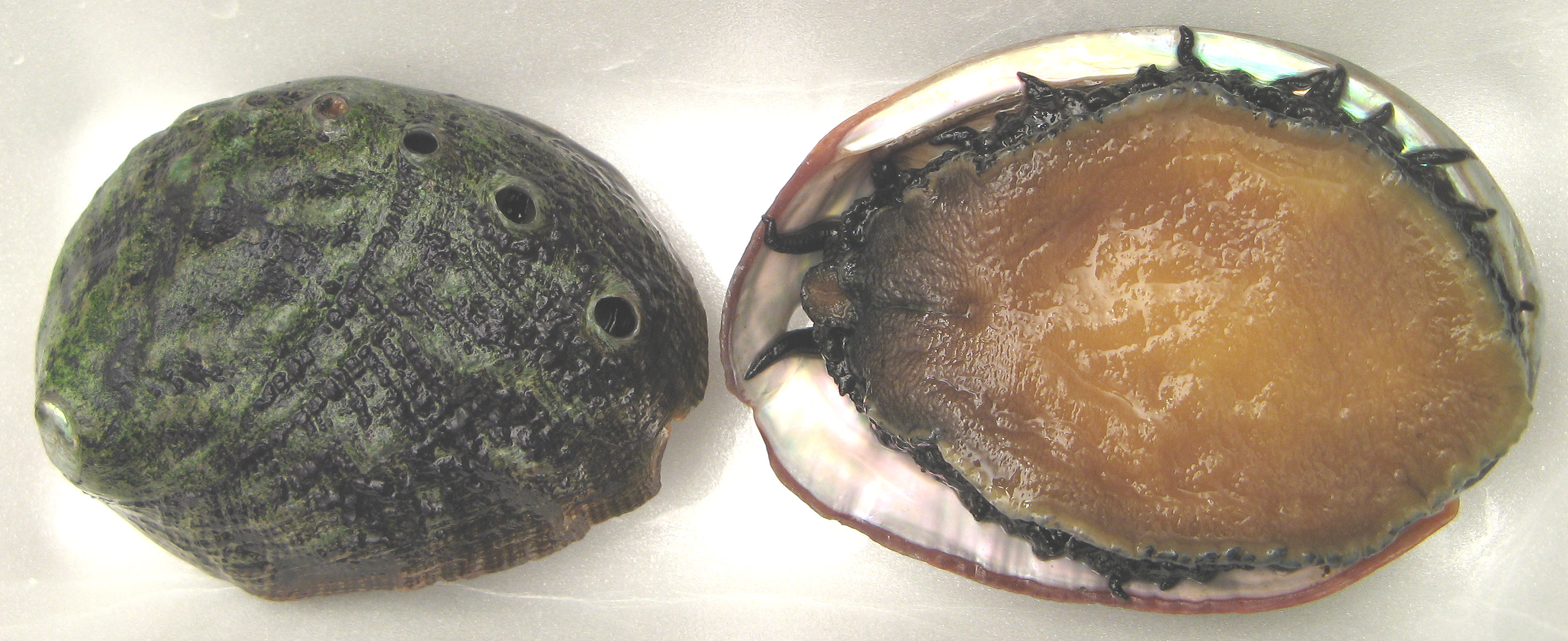
Haliotis abalone

Utamaro depicts a group of nude ama divers finishing a day of diving for haliotis abalone sea snails. He draws them naturalistically, without elongation or other distortions that ukiyo-e artists typically employed to present ideal models of beauty. They are tall with white skin and long, stringy black hair that is wet and dangles from them. They appear soft-skinned and the contours of their exposed upper bodies have reddish outlines, emphasizing their strong, corporeal figures at physical labour. The scenery is made up of light greens and other pale colours, which contrast with the red clothes several of the figures wear.

In the left print, a nude woman with a red waistcloth wrapped around her lower body crouches, supporting herself with her hands on the ground behind her and lowering one leg in the water. A woman standing beside her points towards the water; she is lightly sunburned. A woman in patterned blue in the central print combs her wet hair while breastfeeding a child clad in an apron; Utamaro often depicted women breastfeeding. In the right print a woman wrings the end of a red waistcloth tied around her waist while holding in her mouth a knife used for opening shells. She looks behind herself to the viewer's right, where a crouched woman selects shellfish from a basket to buy.

A kyōka poem appears on the right print that reads:

取得たる鮑のわたに引きかえて 海士のはたへは目の毒そかし
Shutokutaru awabi no wata ni hikikaete ama no hada e wa me no doku sokashi
More tempting than the flesh of the abalone is the skin of the diver

Goncourt considered the prints "images of a very high style, and they have a charm which is arresting, surprising, even astonishing".

== Enoshima Yūryō Awabi-tori no Zu ==
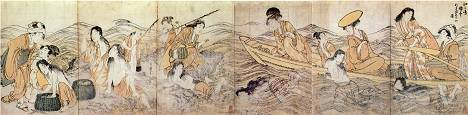
Enoshima Yūryō Awabi-tori no Zu, Utamaro, colour woodblock print on handmade washi paper, c. 1804–06, about 19 by 74 centimetres (7 in × 29 in)

Utamaro had the hexaptych Enoshima Yūryō Awabi-tori no Zu (江之嶋遊りょうあわびとりの図, "Abalone divers hunting in Enoshima") published in the c. 1791. Each koban-sized vertical print measures about 19 by 12 centimetres (7 in × 5 in) and is signed Utamaro hitsu (哥麿筆, "the brush of Utamaro"). Utamaro employs a simple line in delineating the well-proportioned corporeality of the bodies and the undulations of the waves.

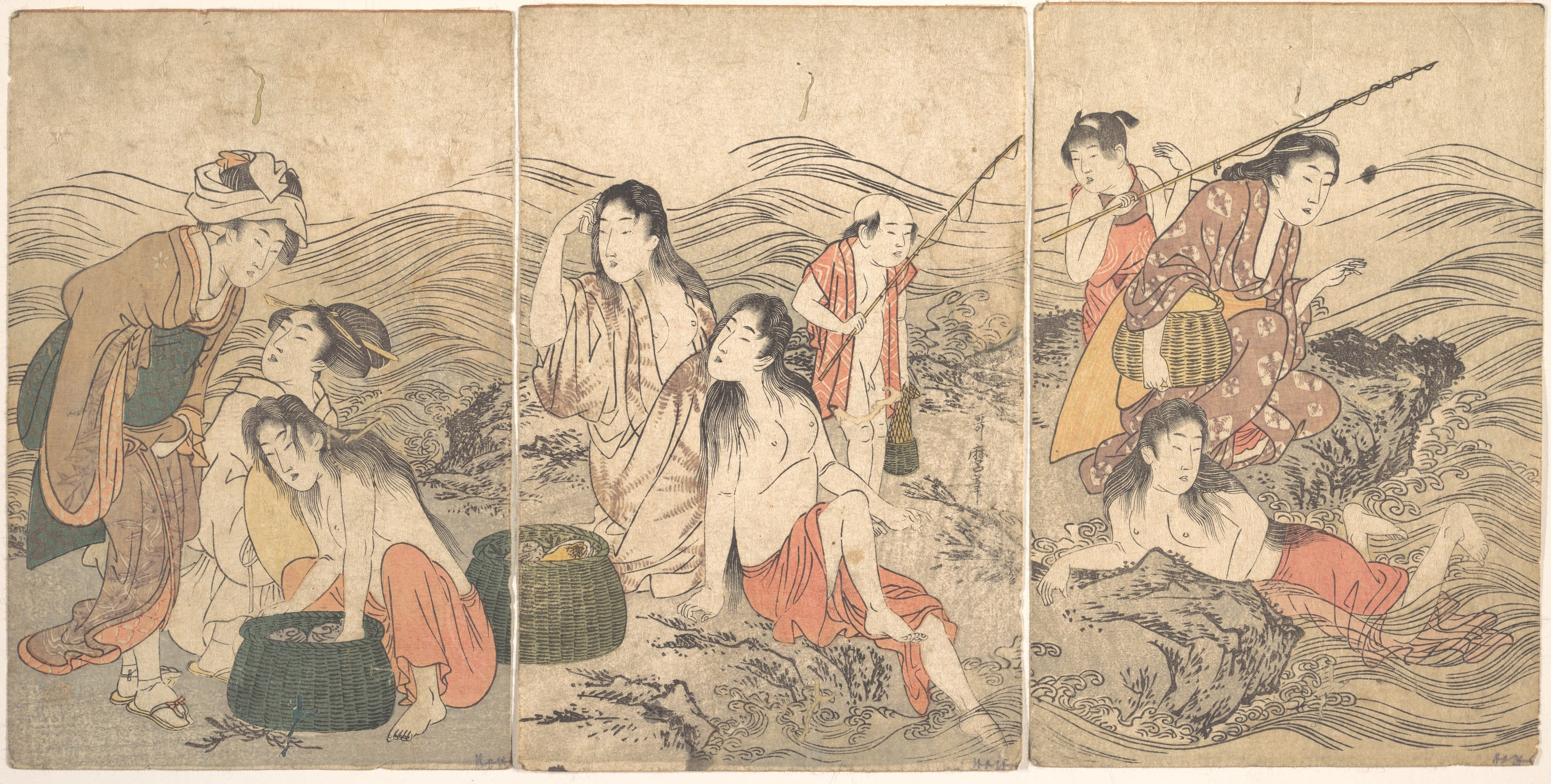
Enoshima Yūryō Awabi-tori no Zu, left three prints

== Enoshima Awabi-ryō no Zu ==
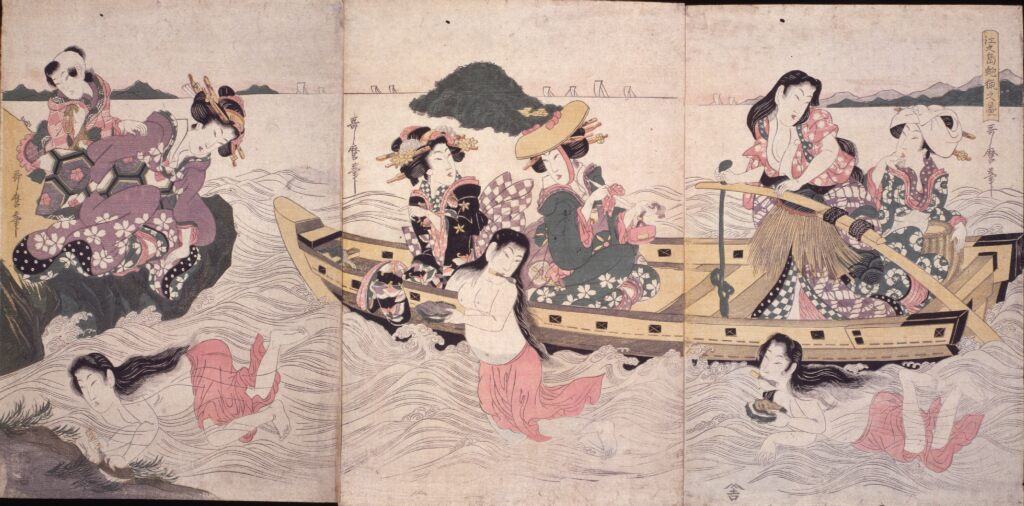
Enoshima Awabi-ryō no Zu, Utamaro, coloured ink woodblock print on handmade washi paper, c. 1804–18, about 39 by 79 centimetres (15 in × 31 in)

Utamaro's heir Utamaro II had the triptych Enoshima Awabi-ryō no Zu (江之島鮑猟之図, "Catching abalone in Enomshima") published in the Bunka era (1804–18) by either Kagaya Kichiemon or Yorozuya Kichibei. Each print measures about 39 by 26 centimetres (15 in × 10 in) and is signed Utamaro.

Utamaro II makes a mitate-e parody of abalone hunting in Enoshima, where the fishing was done not by women but men (also called ama, but spelt with the characters 海士, "sea-man"). The picture depicts nude female ama (海女, "sea-woman") divers hunting for abalone as luxuriously-dressed women watch from a boat.
