= Utamakura (Utamaro) =

Book of woodblock prints by Kitagawa Utamaro

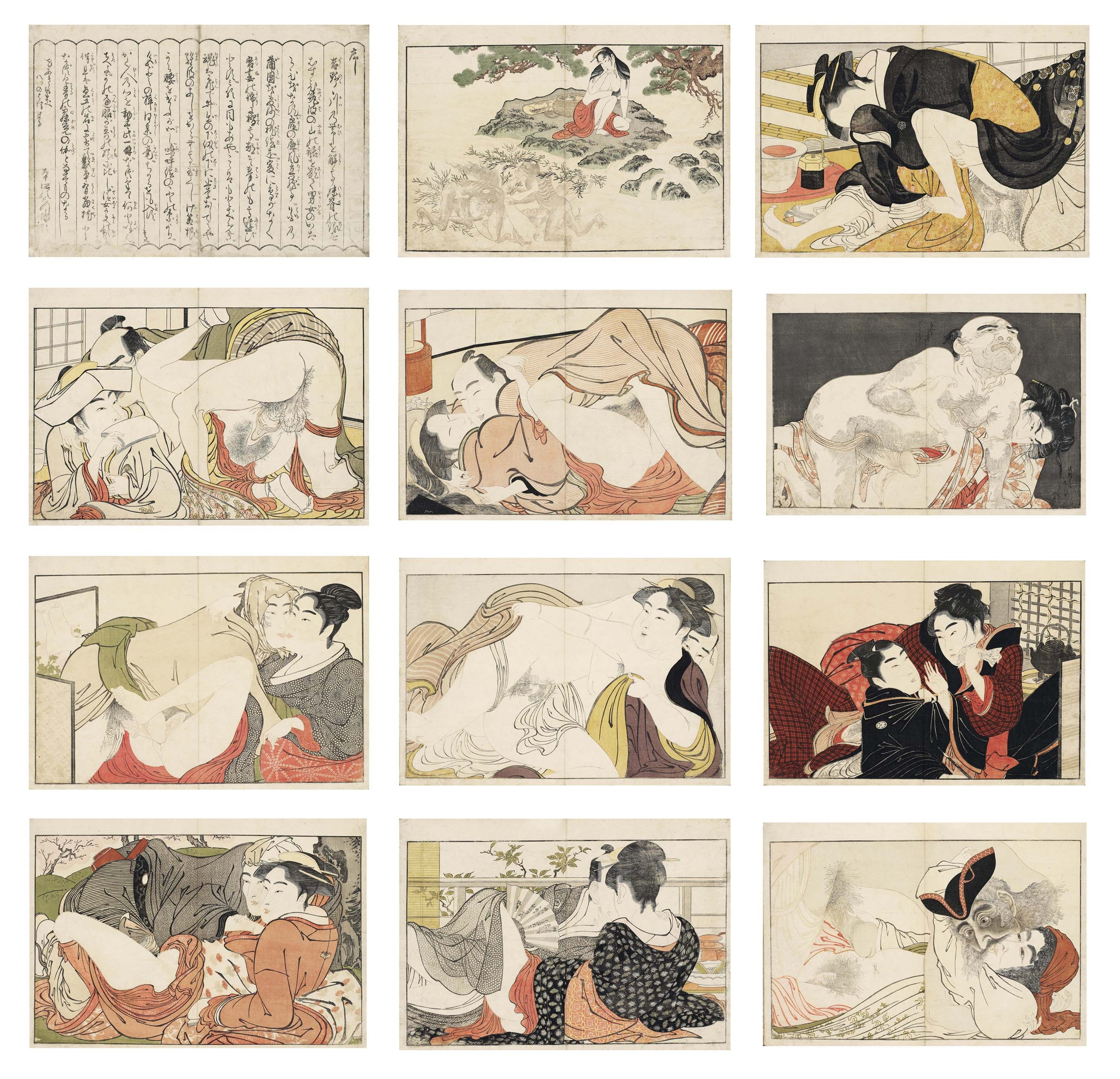

Utamakura (歌まくら, "poem[s] of the pillow") is the title of a 12-print illustrated book of sexually explicit shunga pictures, published in 1788. The print designs are attributed to the Japanese ukiyo-e artist Kitagawa Utamaro, and the book's publication to Tsutaya Jūzaburō.

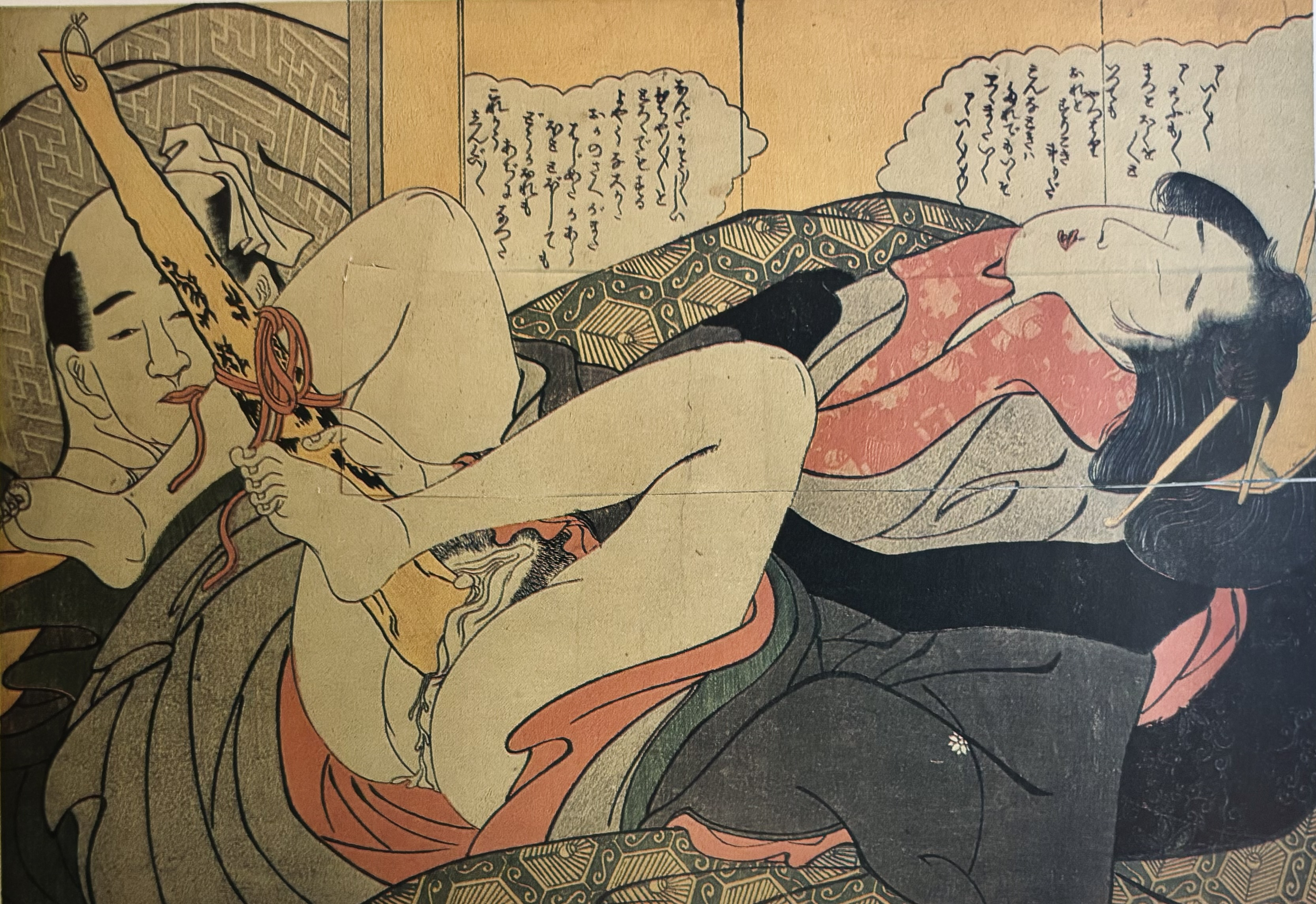
Portrait of the Floating World, A Pair of Lovers by Utamaro (From The Poem of the Pillow)

== Background ==
Ukiyo-e art flourished in Japan during the Edo period from the 17th to 19th centuries, and took as its primary subjects courtesans, kabuki actors, and others associated with the "floating world" lifestyle of the pleasure districts. Alongside paintings, mass-produced woodblock prints were a major form of the genre. In the mid-18th century full-colour nishiki-e prints became common, printed using a large number of woodblocks, one for each colour.

Kitagawa Utamaro (c. 1753–1806) began designing prints in the 1770s; made his name in the 1790s with his bijin ōkubi-e ("large-headed pictures of beautiful women") portraits, focusing on the head and upper torso. He experimented with line, colour, and printing techniques to bring out subtle differences in the features, expressions, and backdrops of subjects from a wide variety of class and background.

In Edo (modern Tokyo) shunpon albums of prints developed in the 18th century. The books were made of typically twelve prints printed on one side and folded inward, with the edges glued to the adjacent prints and the whole held together with silk thread wrapped around stiff paper covers. The books were of high-quality paper, printed in relatively low printruns, and from the 1770s usually used full colour with expensive pigments and other lavish printing techniques. Sometimes they came with additional pages of text.

== Description and analysis ==
The prints are unsigned, but they are attributed to Kitagawa Utamaro (c. 1753 – 1806). The preface is signed with the pen name Honjo no Shitsubuka ("Profligate of Soggy Honjo"); amongst those suspected to have written it are the writer and poet Tōrai Sanna (1744–1810) and the poet Akera Kankō (1740–1800). The prints are followed by two stories told over two spreads of text. The stories and prints each stand independent of one another.

Utamakura (歌枕, "poem pillow") is a classical Japanese rhetorical concept in which poetical epithets are associated with place names. Utamaro takes advantage of the makura ("pillow") portion to suggest intimate bedroom activity; the terms utamakura and makura-kotoba ("pillow word[s]") are used throughout the preface.

Unlike other illustrated books of the time, Utamakura is devoid of accompanying text, and employs luxurious techniques such as embossing, the dusting of mica for a glittering effect, and bokashi, a technique by which gradations of colour are achieved by applying varying amounts of ink to the printing block.

The book appeared in 1788. The prints are multicolour nishiki-e woodblock prints on handmade washi paper. Each horizontal print is in ōban size, about 25.5 by 37 centimetres (10 in × 15 in). The book bears no publisher's seal, but from the blue covers of the folding album are the same as others published by Tsutaya Jūzaburō at the time, and the clothing of many of the figures bears an ivy crest similar to Tsutaya's. Few copies remain, and researchers rarely have access to complete sets.

=== Preface ===
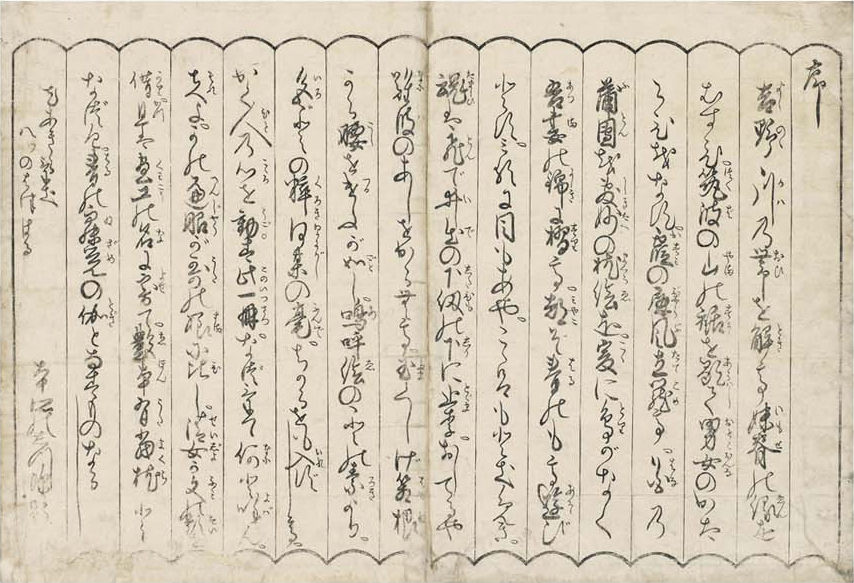

Loosening the sash of Yoshino River, forging a bond 'twixt Imo and Se mountains, spreading the skirts of Mount Tsukuba— thus do lovers plight their troth. Enveloping themselves in a screen of mist, spreading a quilt of flowers, reaching for a pillow ... We hereby print pillow pictures in brocades of the East as a plaything of spring at court. With one glance the eye is startled, the heart throbs, the spirit leaps [Ide], pausing below the sash, pressing, pressing, entwining the legs like the reeds of Naniwa, from the jewel-comb box of Hakone onwards, it is akin to using the hips. Ah! Rather than some amateur at drawing, the brush of one who is skilled in the art of love, without pressing too hard, this is the way to move the hearts of men. And so, what name shall I give this volume? Why yes, likening it to a poem by Bishop Henjō, borrowing the title of a letter by Lady Sei, and even coming close to the name of the artist, I call it Ehon utamakura, "Poem of the Pillow" — a companion to awakening in spring perhaps.
First spring, 1788
Honjo no Shitsubuka (Note: Translation by Shūgo Asano and Timothy Clarke, 1995) (Note: 吉野ゝ川の帯を解て妹背の縁をむすひ、筑波の山の裾を顕て男女のかたらひをなす。霞の屏風立籠て、花の蒲団を敷妙の枕絵を、爰に鳥がなく吾妻の錦に摺て、都ぞ春のもて遊びとす。ミるに目もあや、こゝろもときめき、魂は飛で井出の下紐の下に止り、おしてるや難波のあしをからむて、玉くしげ箱根から腰を遣が如し。嗚呼、絵のことの素より、色ごとの粋何其の毫、ちからをも入ずして、かく人の心を動す。此一冊、なづけて何と呼ん。夫よ。かの遍昭が哥の様に此し、清女が文の題を借、且は画工の名に寄て、艶本有当枕となづけ、春の寐覚の伽となすものならし。 天あきらけき 八ツのはつはる 本所のしつ深題)

=== Print No. 1 ===
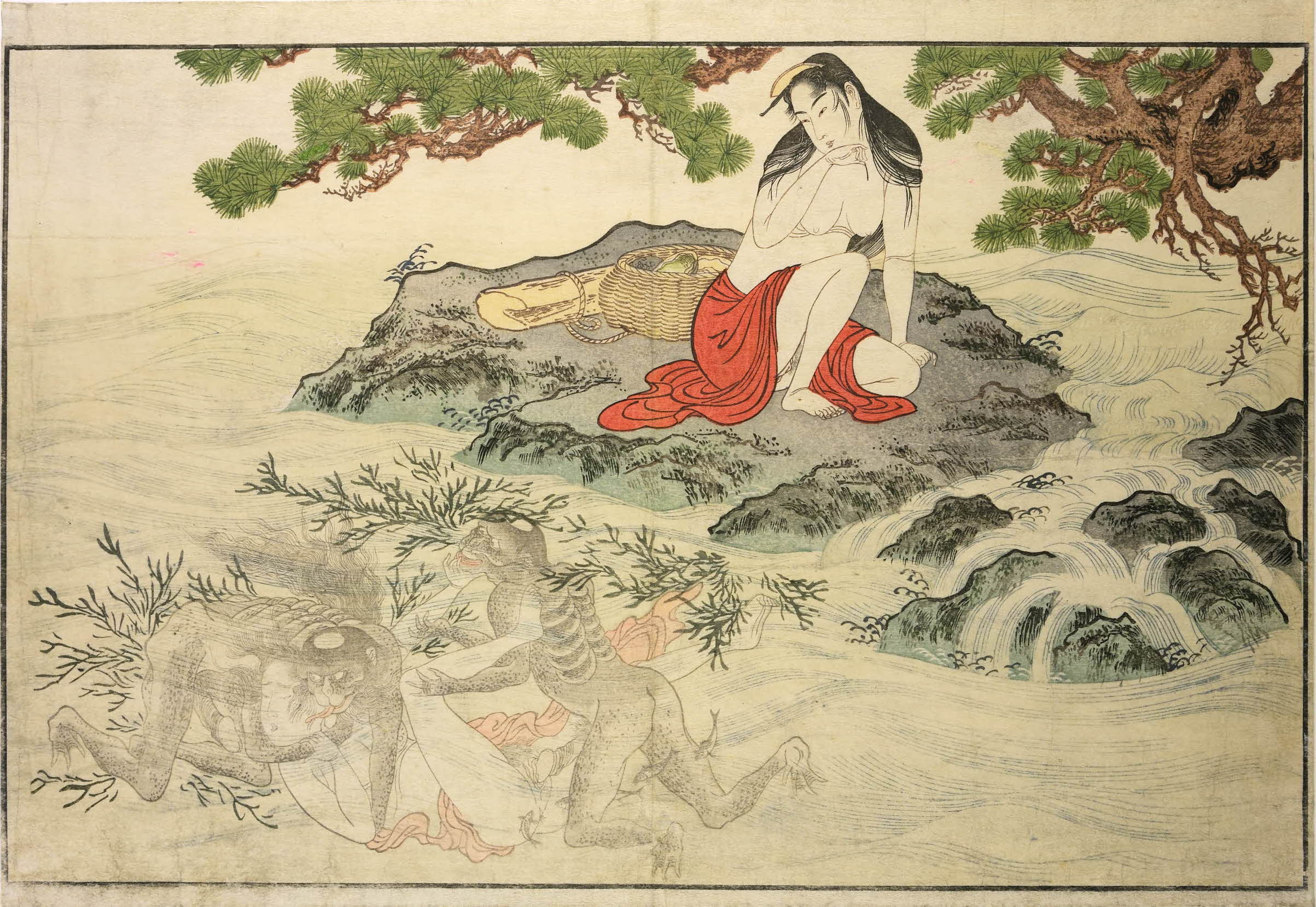

The first print depicts a pair of kappa river creatures raping an ama diver underwater. Her hair flows with the running current, and small, seemingly curious fish swim near. Another ama watches seated on a rock with an ashamed look, her right hand held to her mouth. Her drenched, dishevelled hair sticks to her. She wears a red waistcloth, but her genitals can still be seen. To the French art critic Edmond de Goncourt she "appear[s] languid and susceptible to temptation.

Utamaro employs a varied contrast of tones in the area of the rocks, while fine lines of the running current partially obscure the underwater scene. Careful attention goes to the individual strands of the women's hair. The amas in this picture demonstrate the manner in which he depicted them in future prints.

=== Print No. 2 ===
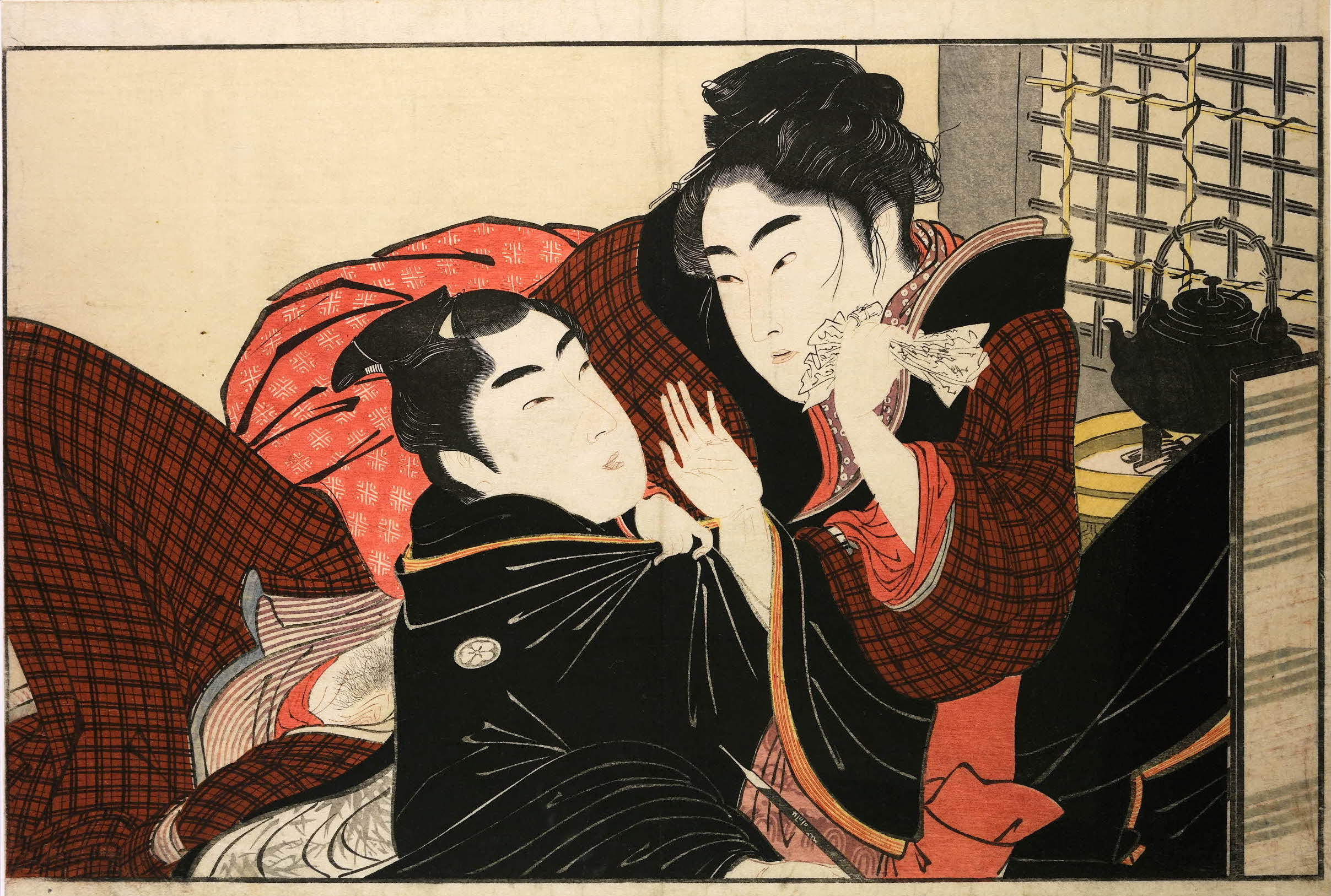

A wakashū (adolescent boy) and his older lover recline in a parlour. The woman grasps her lover's collar and confronts him after finding a letter in his robes. She grips the letter in her left hand, whose little finger is bandaged; Edo-period courtesans cut a little finger as a sign of faith towards a man. From a partial opening in her kimono, the woman's pubic hair can be seen. A tea kettle boils on a brazier in the background.

=== Print No. 3 ===
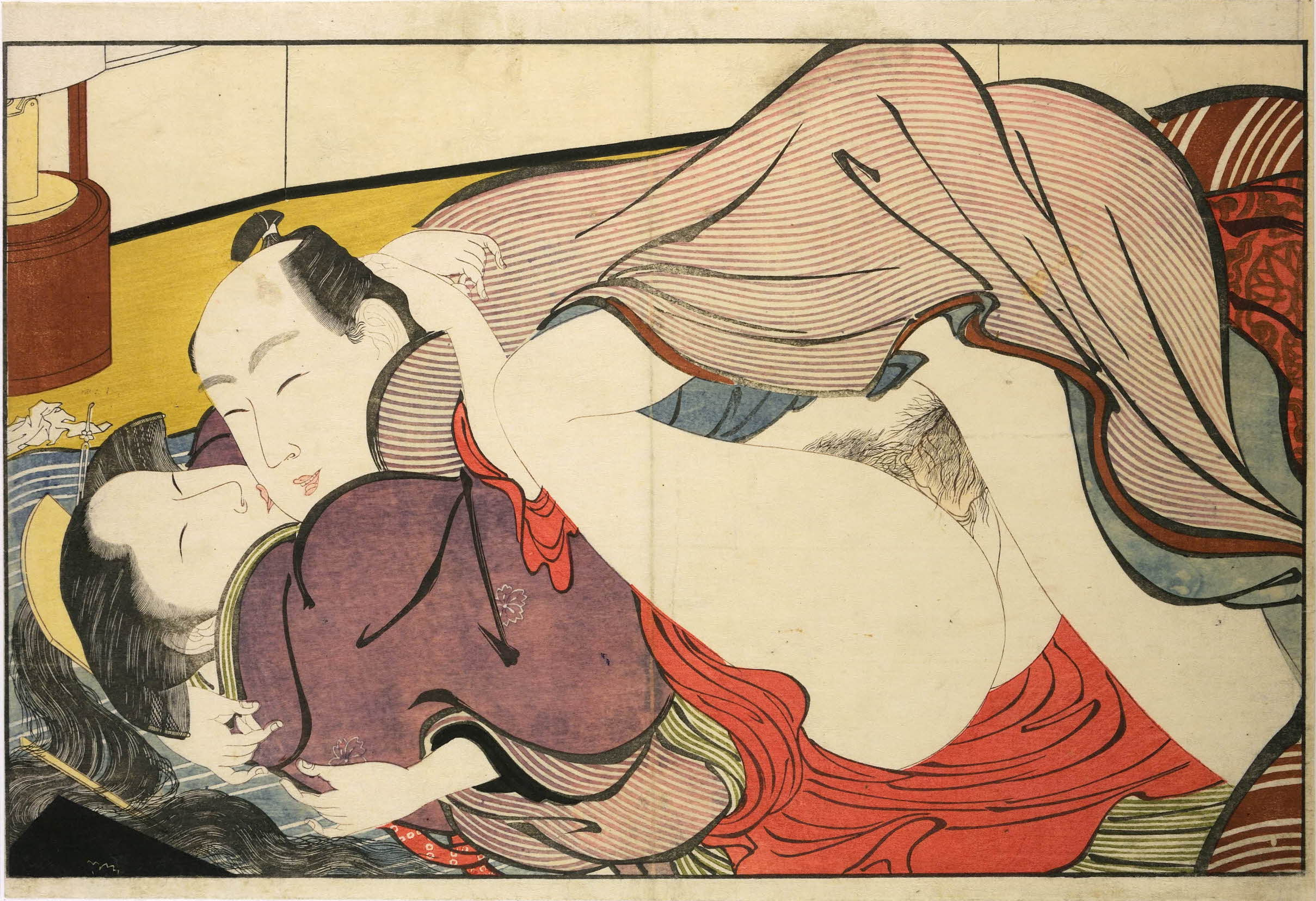

A couple has joyous sex on the lamplit floor with eyes closed. The woman kisses the man's cheek with a look of ecstasy. She has shaved eyebrows, indicating she is married. The pair appear to be on a bedroom floor surrounded by a byōbu folding screen, but that she is still in her kimono suggests her partner is not her husband.

=== Print No. 4 ===
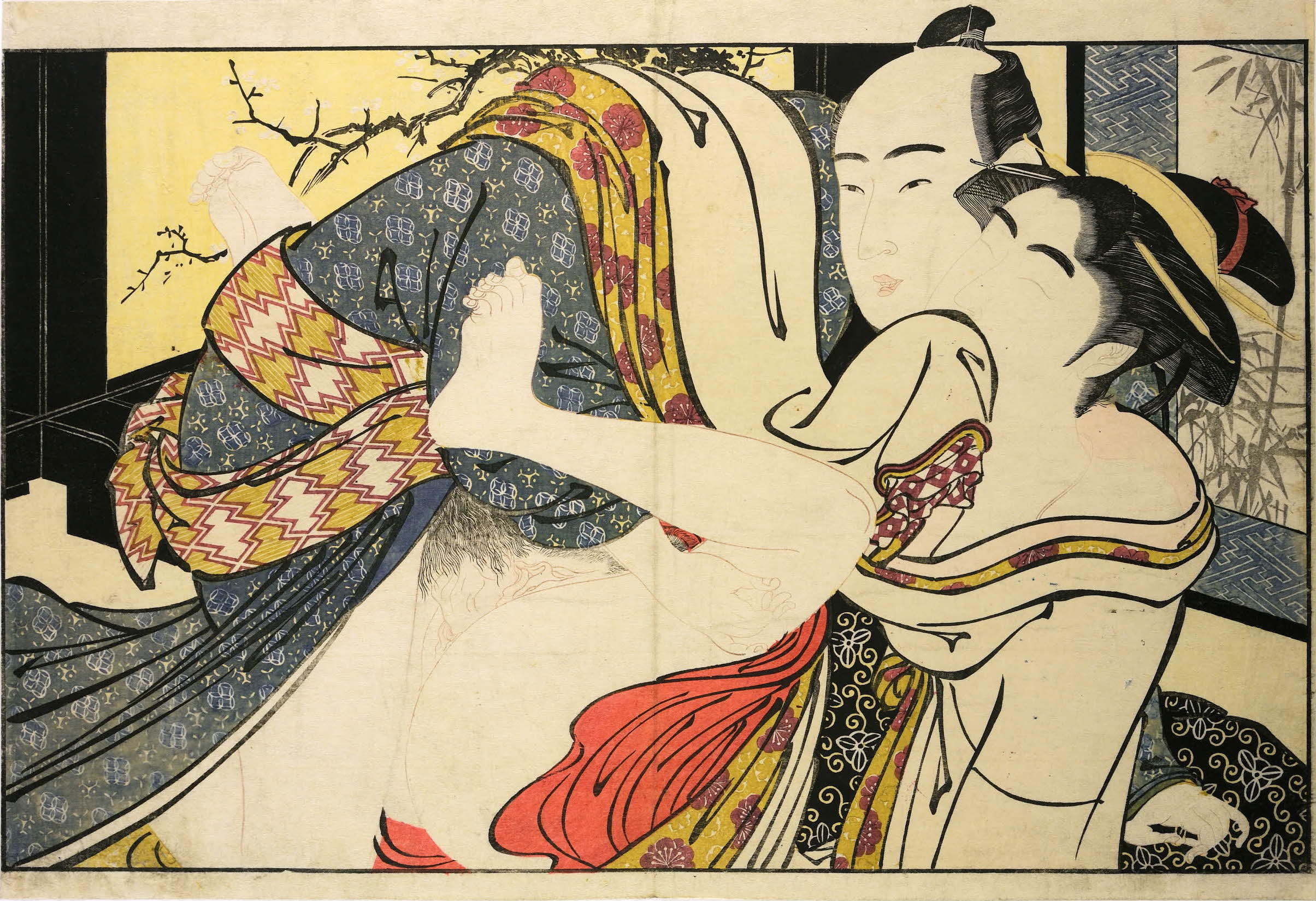

Two lovers have sex on the floor in front of a pair of byōbu screens decorated with the images of plum blossoms and bamboo. The male is a samurai, and his topknot protrudes beyond the enclosing frame of the image. The woman's kimono bears a Japanese primrose mon crest, a mark born by the geisha Tomimoto Toyohina, whom Utamaro often depicted.

=== Print No. 5 ===
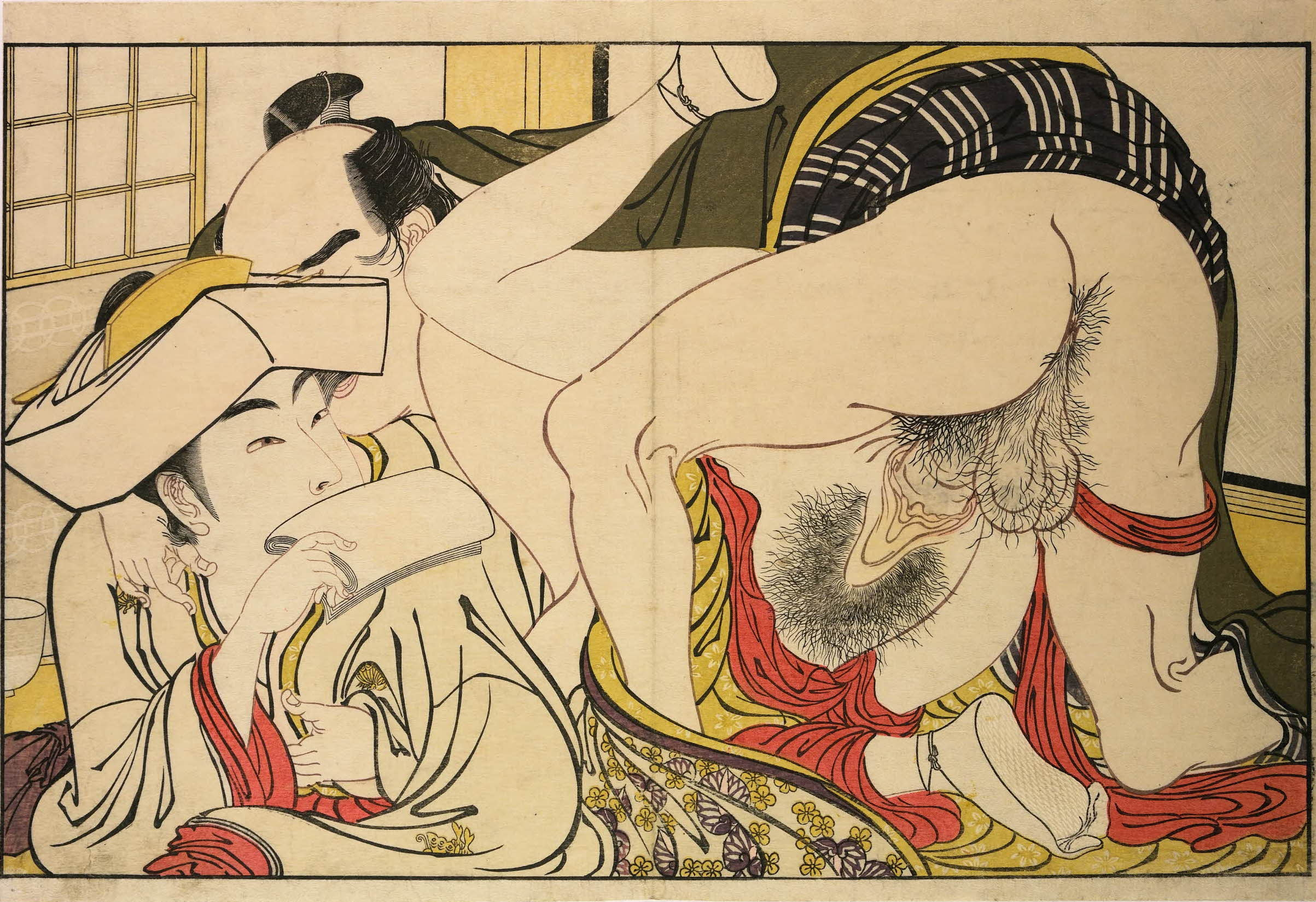

From the woman's tsunokakushi headdress the scene is presumed to take place at a shrine; since the Meiji period (1868–1912), the tsunokakushi has come to be associated with Japanese weddings, but in the Edo period they were used for temple visits. The picture suggests the visit was but a pretence for a secret tryst between what are probably servants in samurai mansions. The young man leans toward the young woman, appearing to whisper in her ear, while the woman holds a wad of kaishi paper to her mouth. The ukiyo-e scholar Kiyoshi Shibui named the male "Orisuke" (折助), a nickname given to young male servants in the Edo period, but Yoshikazu Hayashi doubted the figure came from such a low rank.

Amongst the fine printing details are the glittering mica dust applied to the tsunokakushi and the karasuri embossed pattern on the sole of the bride's tabi sock.

=== Print No. 6 ===
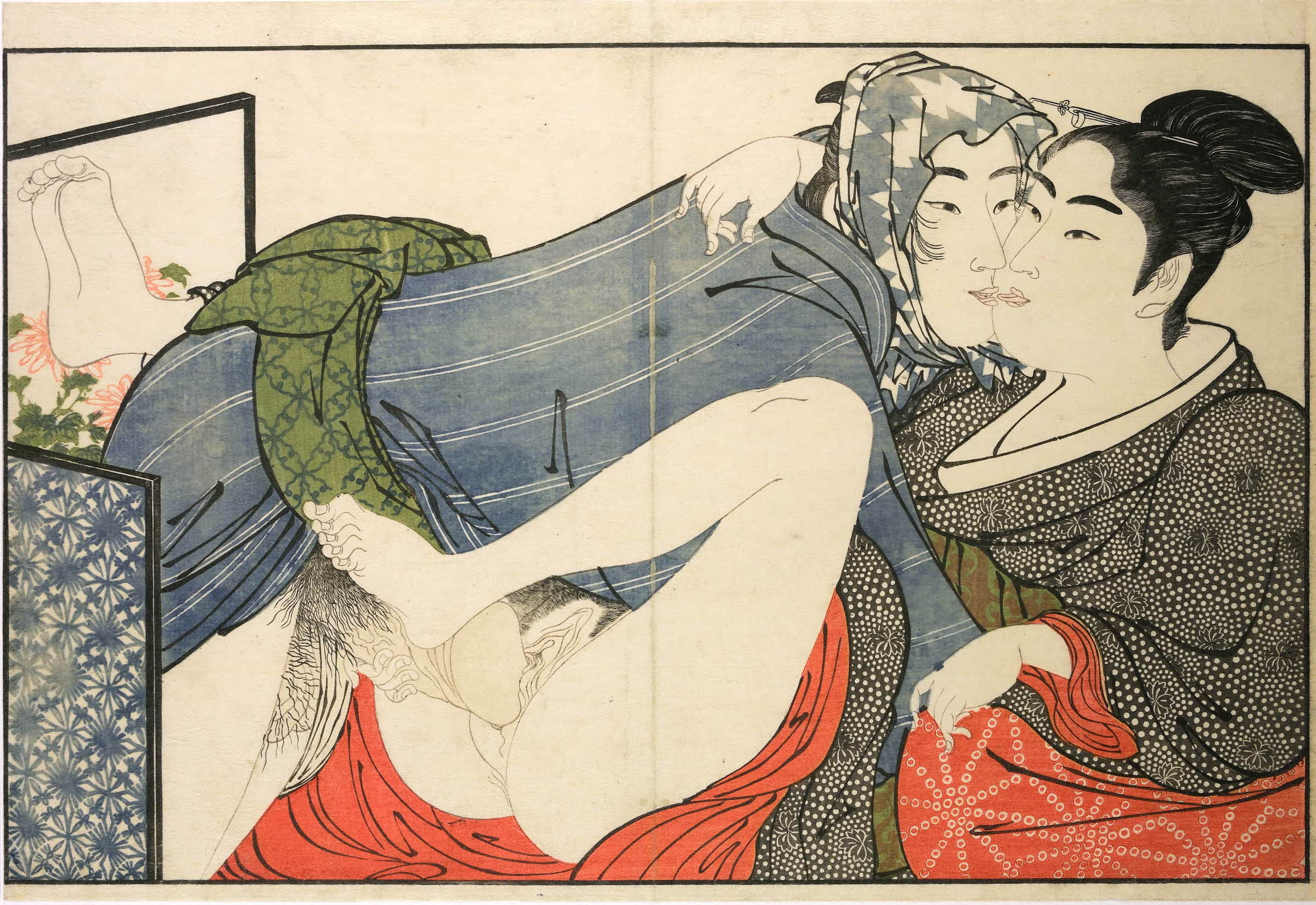

A young man has sex on the floor with a kept mistress. The woman sticks out her tongue towards the mouth of the man, who has his head covered in a kerchief. His ruffled, curly sidelocks protrude from the kerchief, in contrast to the straight, brushed up hairs of the nape of the woman's neck and her sidelocks. Images of chrysanthemums decorated a byōbu folding screen to the left.

=== Print No. 7 ===
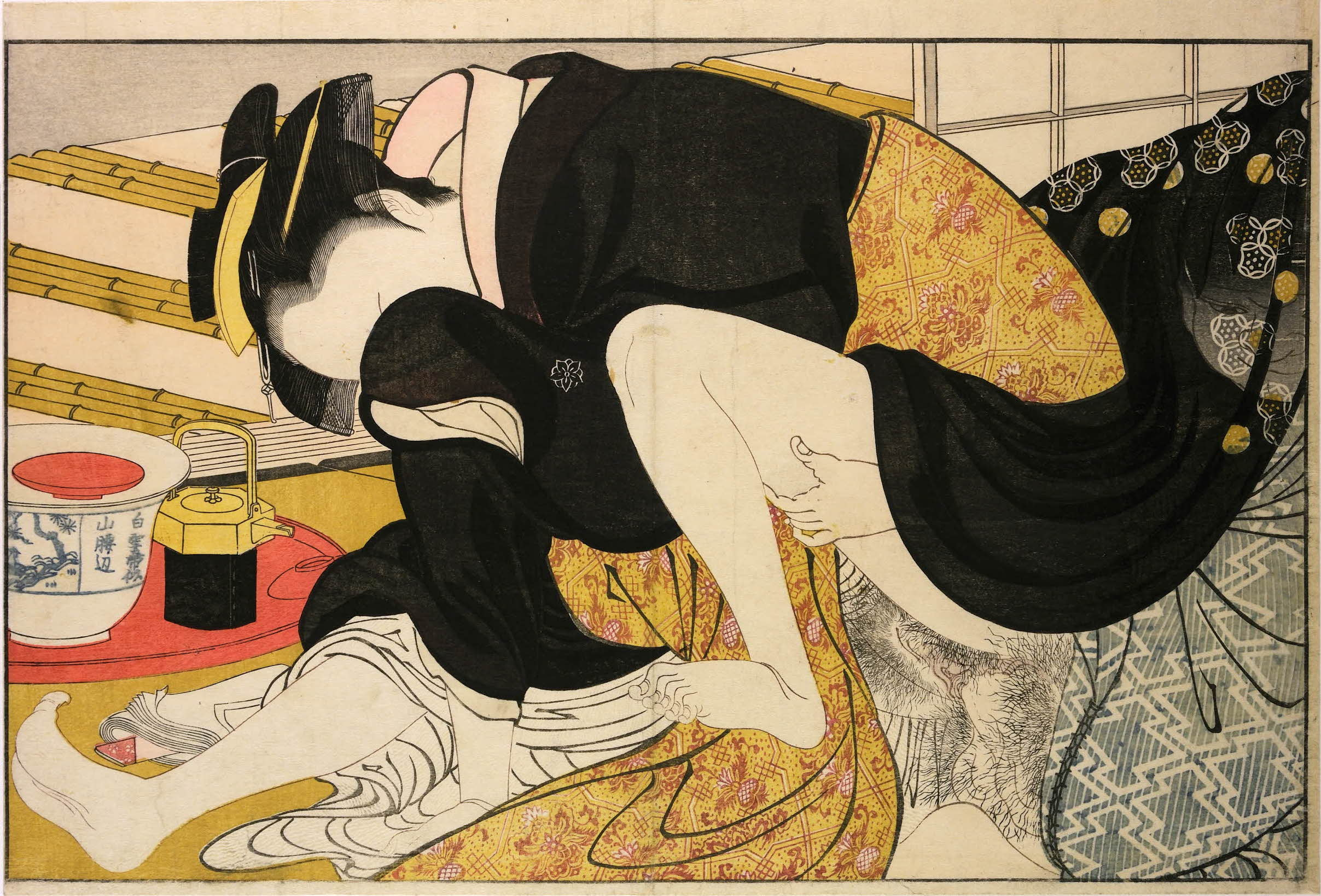

A pair has sex on the floor by an open veranda. By the threshold of the veranda sits a sake set on a tray with sakazuki (Note: 盃 sakazuki) sake cups and a chōshi (Note: 銚子 chōshi) sake decanter on it, suggesting the scene follows a Budhhist memorial service.

The woman's eyebrows are shaved, indicating a married woman, but her black kimono suggests she has recently been widowed. She covers her face, perhaps in shame, and her emotional state is expressed in her tensed toes. The black of her kimono contrasts with the white of her skin.

The man's grasps the woman's leg from behind to facilitate penetration. Though difficult to see at first glance, through the woman's translucent silk kimono appears the lusty face of the man. Utamaro made frequent use of printing techniques giving materials the appearance of translucent, such as in Hari-shigoto.

=== Print No. 8 ===
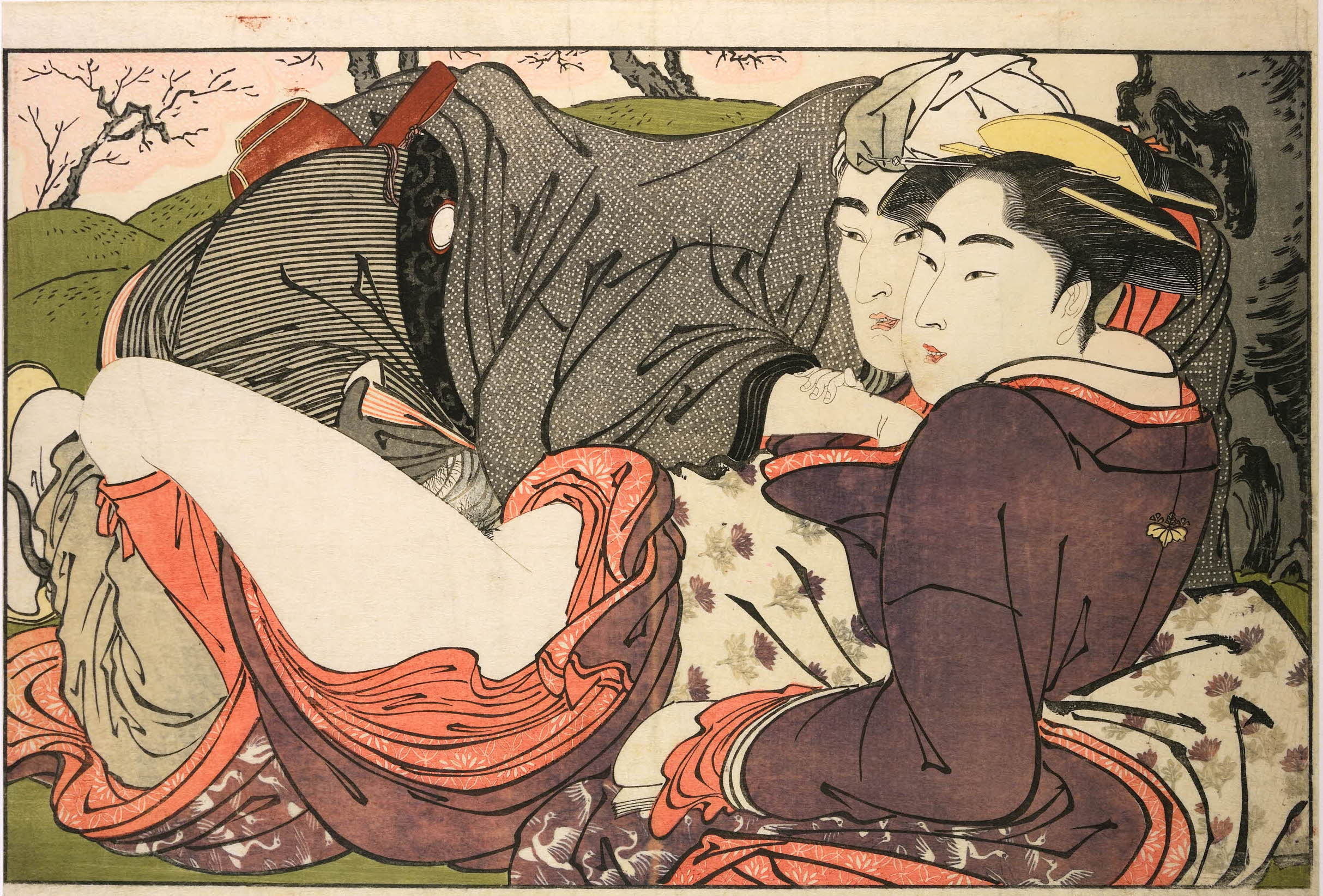

A pair of lovers have sex beneath a sakura cherry tree in bloom. The woman is dressed as a geisha. The man presses his right hand on her breast within her kimono.

=== Print No. 9 ===
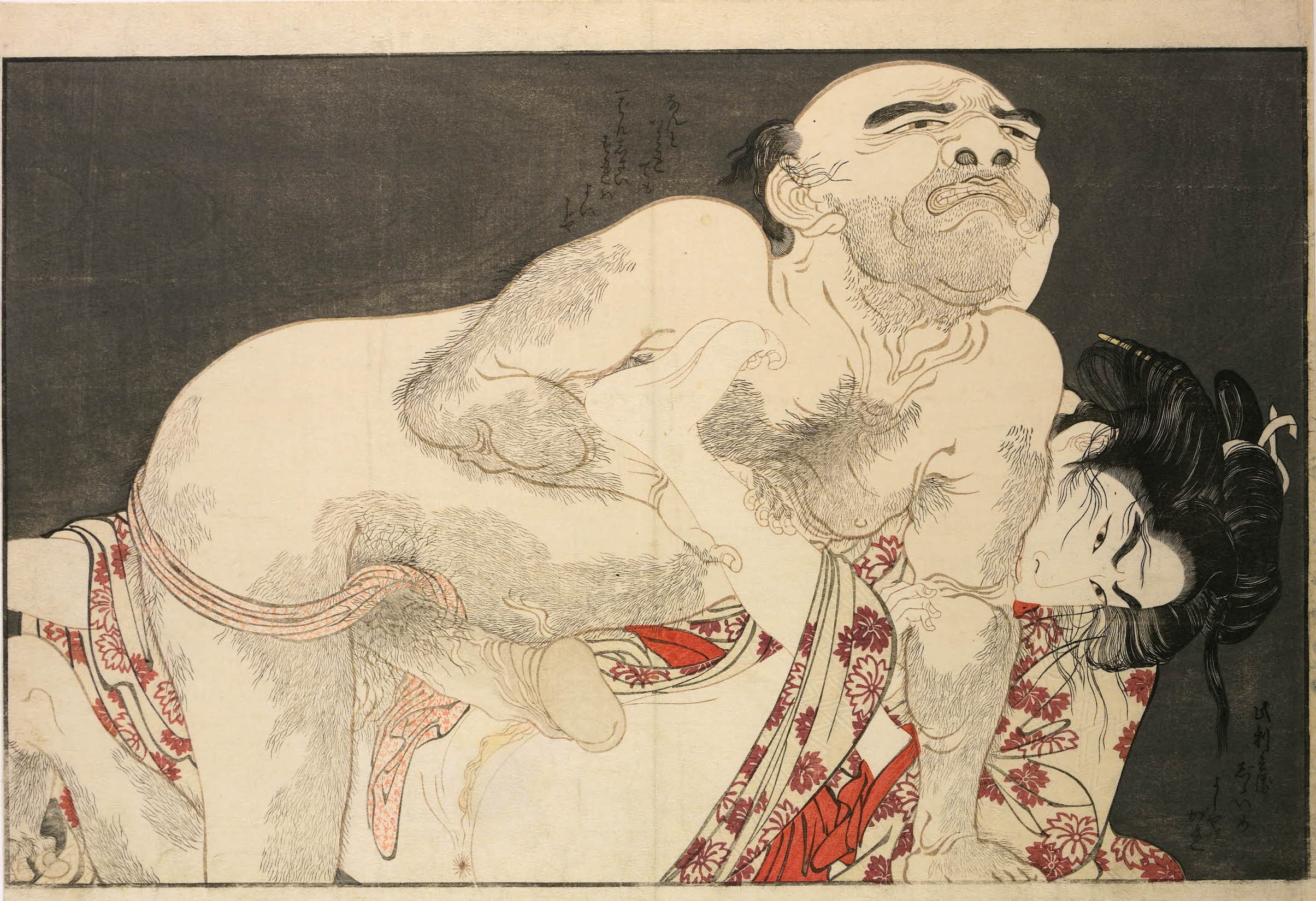

A young woman tries to fight off a hairy older man who is raping her; she bites his arm. Such violence is rare in Edo-period shunga, and the perpetrators are usually depicted as ugly.

This is the only print in the book that includes dialogue. In the inscription in the lower right the woman says:

此利兵衛じじいめ、よしやァがれ
Kono Rihei jijii-me yoshaagare
Let go of me Rihei, you old fool!

In the inscription above him the man replies:

なんといわれても一ばんしさいすればよいのじゃ
Nan to iwarete mo ichiban shisai sureba yoi no ja
Save your words and just keep still.

=== Print No. 10 ===
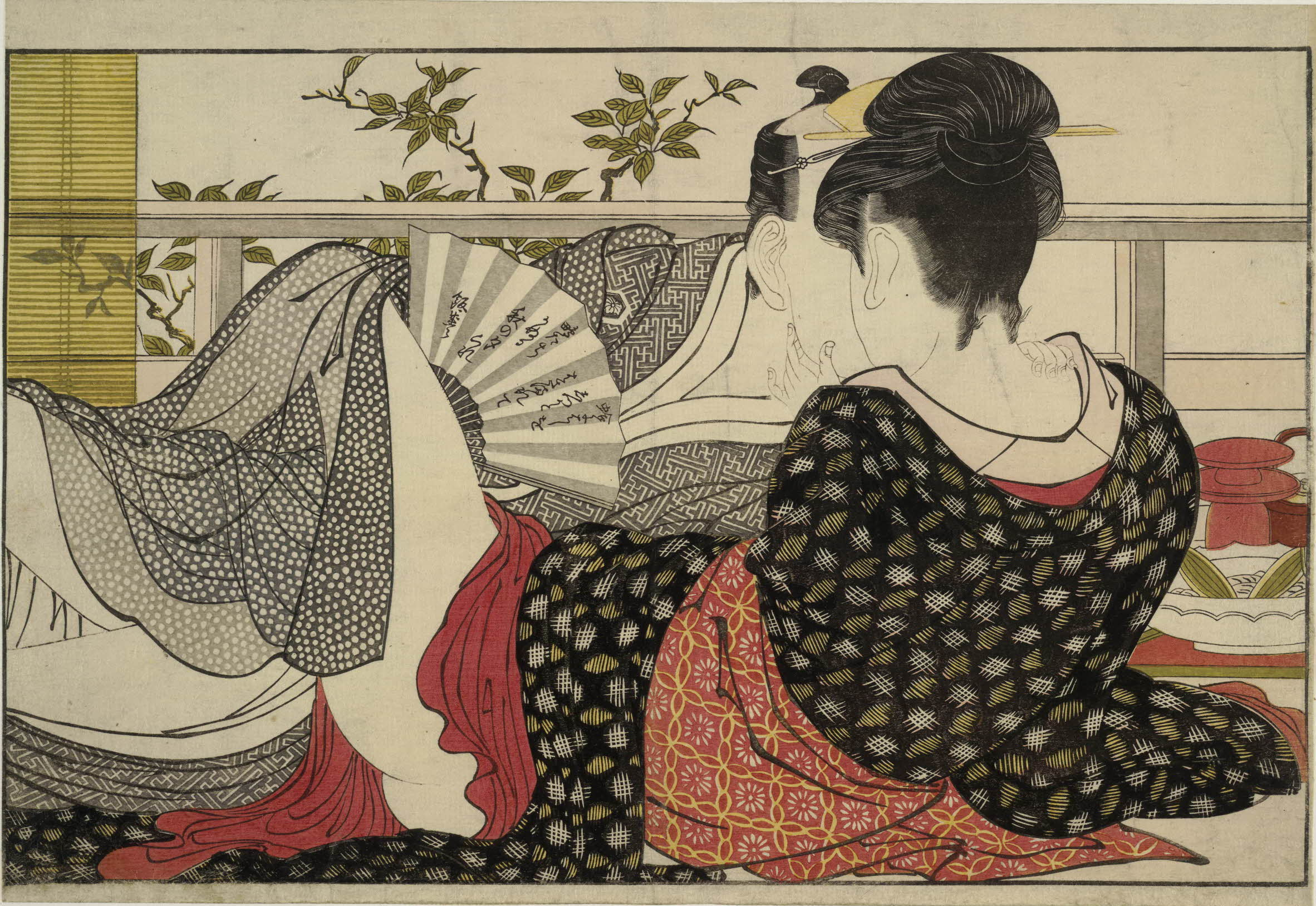

A pair of lovers make love on the floor in a room on the second story of a teahouse. The woman holds the man's face with her in what de Goncourt calls "a torturous and passionate grip". A close look reveals the man's right eye peering out just below the edge of the woman's hair.

The man holds a hand fan on which is inscribed a kyōka poem by Yadoya no Meshimori (1754–1830):

Japanese text	Romanized Japanese	English translation (Note: Translation by Victor Harris, Timothy Clark, and Lawrence Smith)
蛤に はしをしっかと はさまれて 鴫立ちかぬる 秋の夕ぐれ	Hamaguri ni Hashi o shikka to Hasamarete Shigi tachikanuru Aki no yugure	Its beak caught firmly In the clam shell, The snipe cannot Fly away Of an autumn evening

Following the poem appears the inscription meshimori (飯盛), a term for maidservants at inns who also worked as prostitutes.

=== Print No. 11 ===
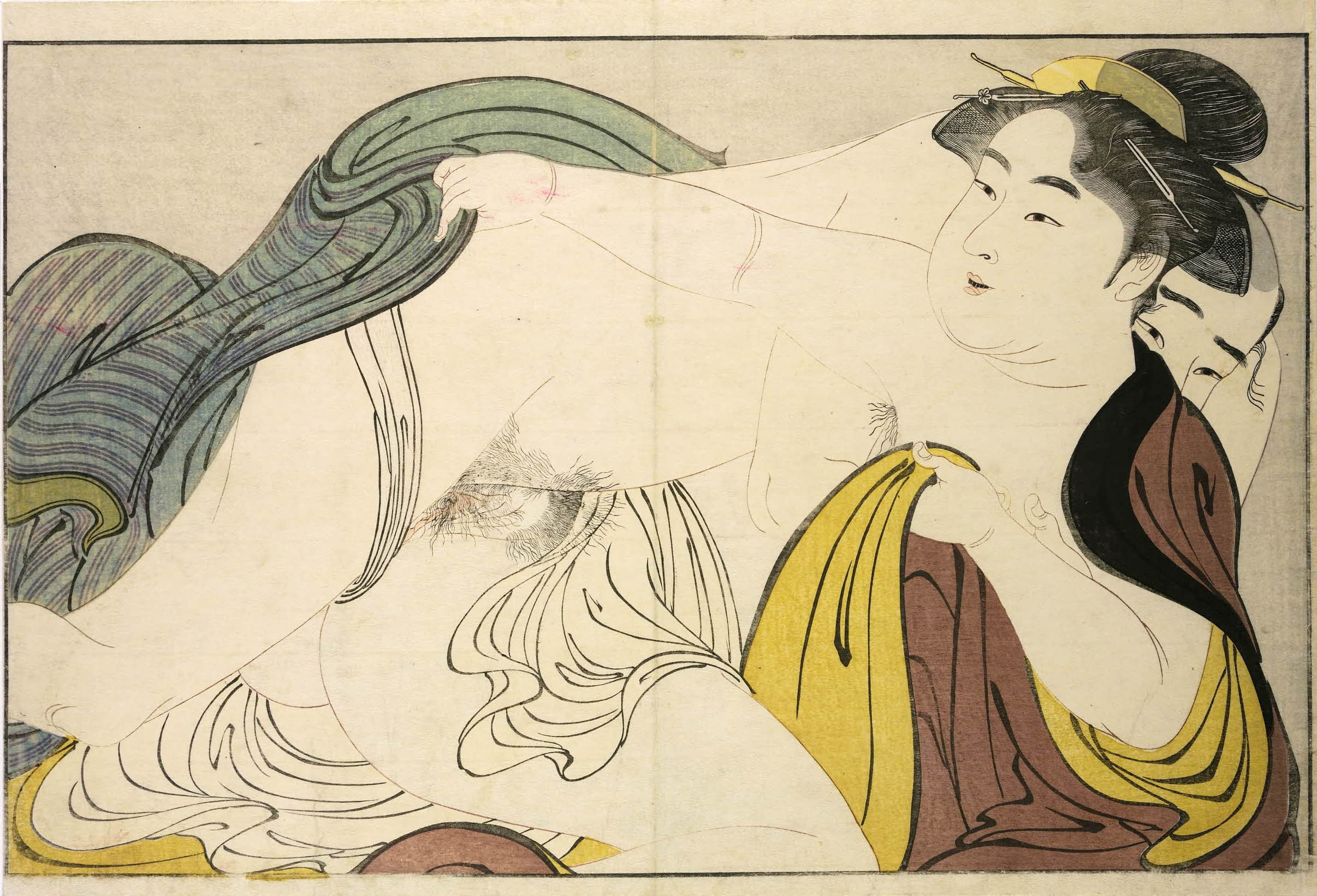

A plump older couple have sex on the floor; the woman pulls a blanket over the man. Kiyoshi Shibui believed the print displayed a taste Utmamaro had in corpulent women; Yoshikazu Hayashi countered that such figures were so rare in Utamaro's print as to make such a thing unlikely.

=== Print No. 12 ===
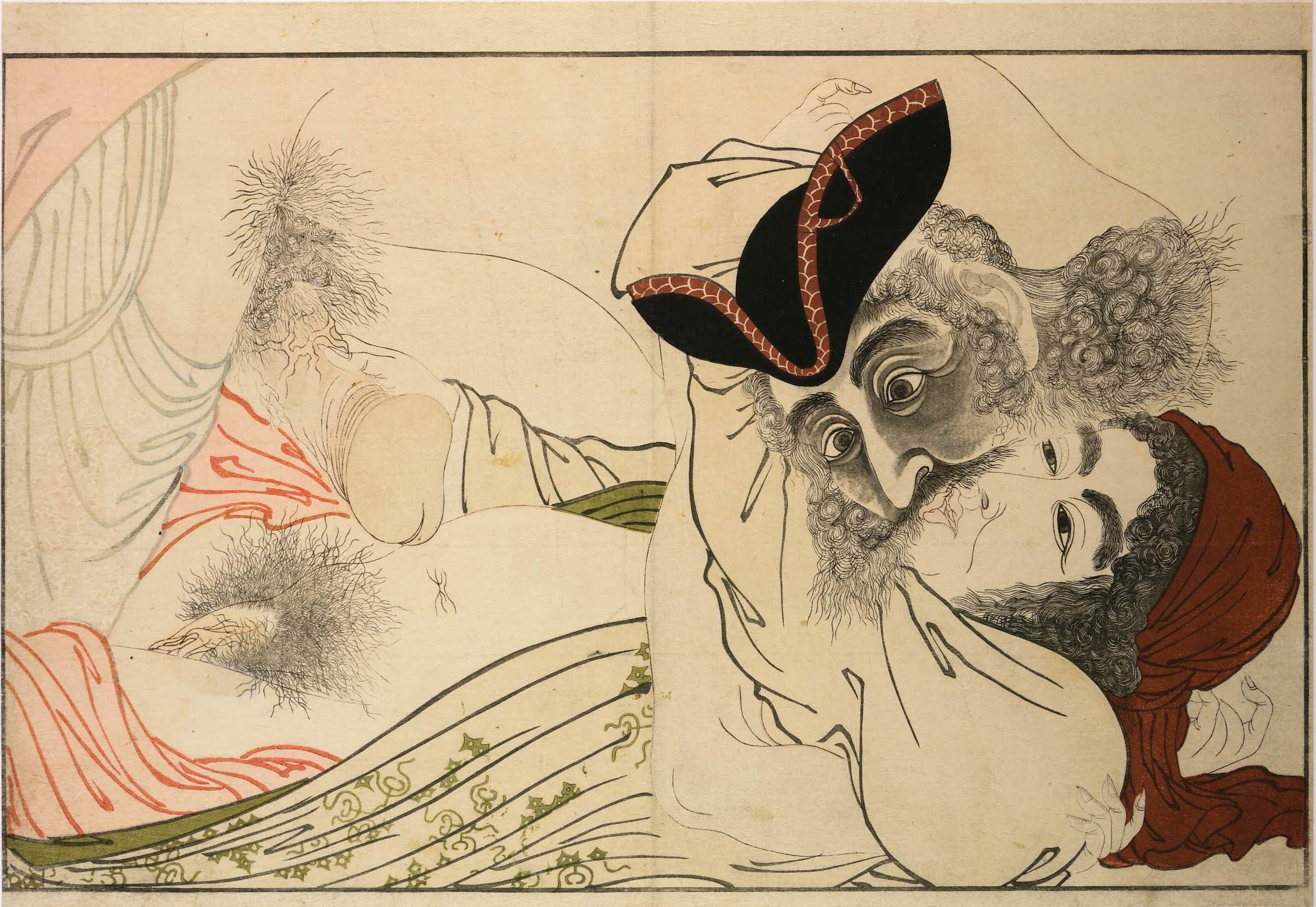

The print is rare in presenting two Westerners having sex; other prints from the era that depict foreigners normally have a foreign male with a Japanese female. The print appeared when the Dutch East India Company was still making trips to Japan; they normally arrived in spring, which brought the Dutch arrivals associations with the erotic connotations of spring, as in the term shunga (春画, "spring picture[s]"). For diplomatic reasons, few such pictures appeared before 1790, after which the Company's visits ended. They stayed at the Nagasakiya inn in the Hongoku-chō neighbourhood in the Nihonbashi district of Edo, and many stopped by to take a look at the foreigners. Utamaro may have seen Dutch people on one of these visits, and thus may have based the man's portrait on observation; women on the other hand were rare visitors to Japan, and the woman's garb is anachronistic.

The man's face is shaded using bokashi. The print receives such attention to detail that even the head of the penis is dusted with mica to give it a glittering effect. The artist Kitao Masanobu remarked on the enormity of the penises Utamaro drew; the French art critic Edmond de Goncourt, on the other hand, praised Utamaro's "power in the line, which makes the drawing of a penis the equal of the Louvre's Hand by Michelangelo".

== Legacy ==
Utamakura has gained a reputation as the first of Utamaro's three most representative erotic books, with Negai no Itoguchi (Note: ねがひの糸ぐち Negai no Itoguchi, "Unravelling the Threads of Desire") (1799) and Ehon Komachi-biki (Note: 本小町引 Ehon Komachi-biki "Picture Book: Pulling Komachi") (1802), and established Utamaro's status as a master of the genre.

De Goncourt called Utamakura "Utamaro's most beautiful erotic book".
