= Unsodo =

Japanese wooblock publishing company

UNSODO Corporation
- Native name: 美術書出版株式会社芸艸堂
- Founded: 1891; 135 years ago Kyoto, Japan
- Founder: Yamada Naosaburō
- Headquarters: Nakagyo-ku, Kyoto, Japan
- Products: Woodblock prints; Books; Stationery
- Website: www.unsodo.net

Unsodo (芸艸堂, Unsōdō) is a Japanese publishing company, specializing in art books. The company was founded in 1891 in Kyoto, Japan by Yamada Naosaburō (山田直三郎), and continues operations at its headquarters in Nakagyo-ku, Kyoto. Amongst other products, they produce hand carved and printed woodblock prints.

== Company name ==
Unsodo (芸艸堂), contains a combination of the kanji 芸艸 (unsō), meaning Rue, and 堂 (dō), a suffix used to indicate a building. The use of rue in the name is due to its use in traditional Japanese bookmark production, as a way to deter pests from damaging books.

== History ==
Founded in Kyoto Japan in 1891, a major part of early production at Unsodo was that of kimono pattern books. Traditional woodblock printing methods would be used, as well as more modern methods, such as collotype printing.

Over time Unsodo acquired carved woodblocks from other publishers in Japan, and would use them to print under their own Unsodo imprint. Unsodo is the only publisher of art books bound using a traditional method named tesuri mokuhanga (手摺木版画).

Unsodo have also commissioned and collaborate with 20th and 21st century artists to produce original carvings and prints, such as Shiro Kasamatsu, Takeuchi Seihō and Kamisaka Sekka. With Seihō, they produced Seihō's Masterpieces (栖鳳逸品集, Seihō's Ippin Shū) between 1937 and 1942 which was described by Jack Hillier as "one of the most magnificent printing achievements of the twentieth century." With Kasamatsu, they have produced in excess of 100 original Shin-hanga prints between 1898 and 1991, which they continue print.

From 1901 to 1906, Unsodo published the design periodical Shin-Bijutsukai (New Oceans of Art), that was edited by Furuya Kōrin and Kamisaka Sekka.

== See also ==
- Ukiyo-e
