= Shin-Bijutsukai =

Japanese design periodical (1901–1906)

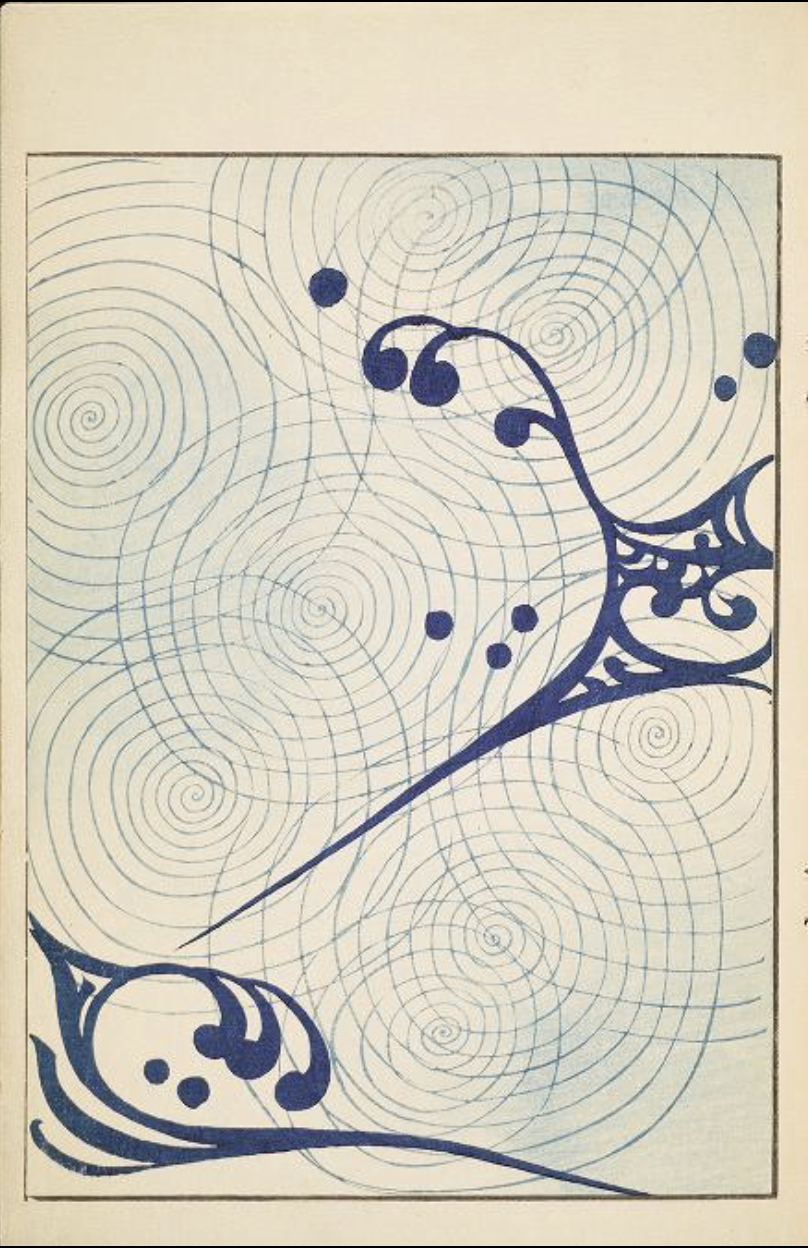
Page from the Japanese periodical Shin-Bijutsukai, 1901

Shin-Bijutsukai (New Oceans of Art) was an early 20th century Japanese magazine that was published between 1901 and 1906. The pages of the magazine were filled with decorative abstract designs in color with very little text. The magazine was edited by Furuya Kōrin and Kamisaka Sekka , and was published by Unsōdō. The title page of the magazines contained this description in English: “New Monthly Magazine of Various Designs by the Famous Artists of To-Day”. The artwork within, produced by several artists, has been described as: captivatingly abstract and layered, dislocating the imagination from place or period: pastel blobs beneath a translucent surface crackled with leaf shapes; oozing, cellular frames encasing beautiful plant matter; a forest whose canopy dissolves into a wash of spilled wine. The magazine was published in double-leafed format in the yamatotoji style.

Shin-Bijutsukai was considered a long-running periodical, having published over 36 volumes that included work by numerous artists whose work was popular at the time.

Copies of the publication are held in the permanent collection of the Smithsonian Institution, the Metropolitan Museum of Art and the University of Pennsylvania's Arthur Tress Collection of Japanese Illustrated Books.

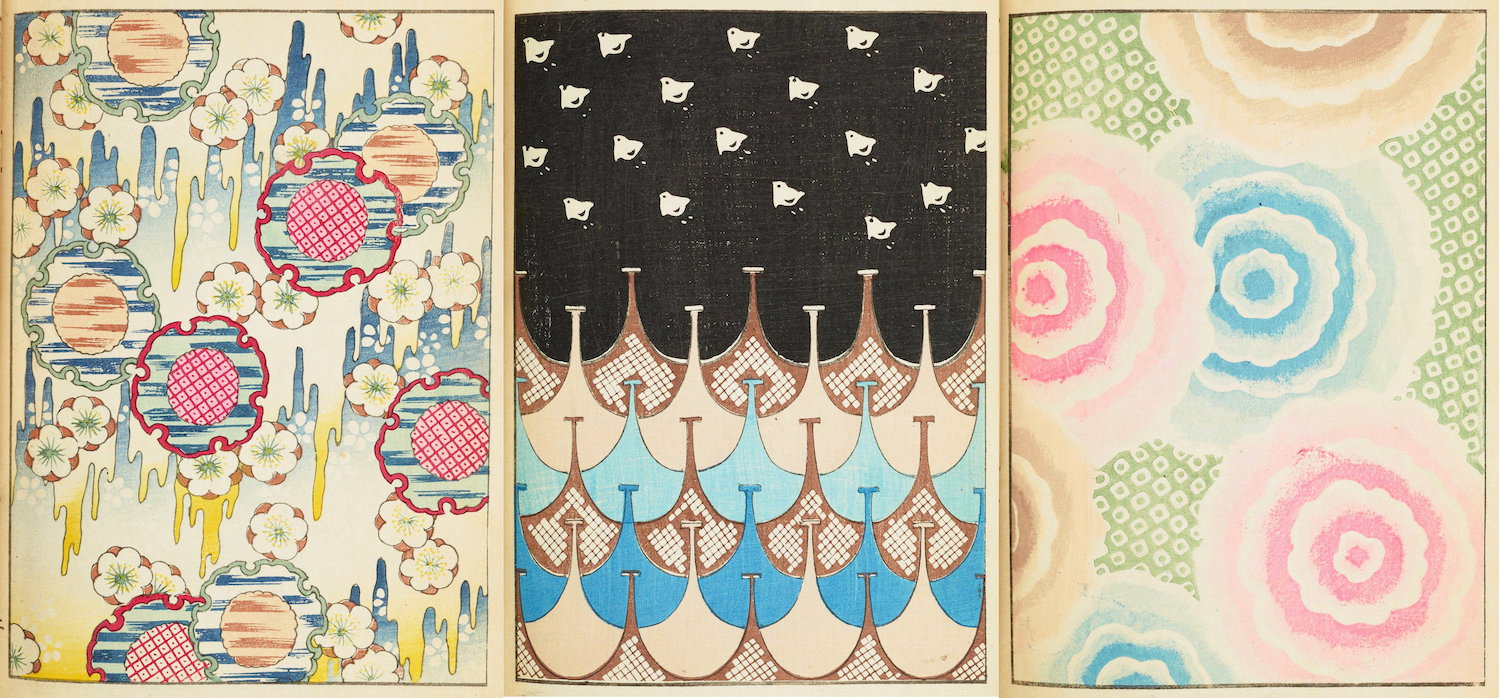
Three pages from the 1901 Shin-Bijutsukai
