= Torii Kotondo =

Japanese painter (1900–1976)

- Born: 21 November 1900
- Died: 13 July 1976 (aged 75)
- Movement: Shin-hanga

Torii Kotondo (鳥居 言人, 21 November 1900 – 13 July 1976) or Torii Kiyotada V (五代目 鳥居 清忠) was a Japanese painter and woodblock printer of the Torii school of ukiyo-e artists. He followed his school's tradition of making prints of kabuki actors (yakusha-e) and involvement with commercial work for kabuki theater. His twenty-one bijin-ga (pictures of beautiful women) are particularly celebrated.

== Life and career ==
Kotondo was born Saitō Akira (斎藤 信) in the Nihonbashi district of Tokyo. At age fourteen his father sent him to study art and history with the yamato-e painter Kobori Tomone, known for his historical and military scenes and for kuchi-e designs for the popular magazine Bungei Kurabu. Torii Kiyotada IV, the seventh head of the Torii school of ukiyo-e artists, adopted Kotondo at age 15 and trained him in the school's specialty producing yakusha-e, portraits of kabuki actors. Kiyotada gave him the name Genjin, alternatively readable as Kotondo, and he began signing kabuki actor prints as Kotondo for the short-lived magazine Shin Nigao and the much longer-running Engei Gahō (1907–1943). Kotondo studied painting under Kiyokata Kaburagi from 1918. Kiyokata's influence is especially visible in the dreamlike quality of Kotondo's later compositions, both painted and printed. Most of Kotondo's woodblock prints date from 1927 to 1933. He adopted the name Kotondo, under which his prints were published, in 1926; from 1922 he had already been signing his bijin-ga paintings as Masahiko, a name he continued to use for most of his paintings even after formalising "Kotondo" for his prints.

Kiyokata influenced Kontodo's bijin-ga portraits along with shin hanga designers Goyō Hashiguchi and Itō Shinsui. In 1925 he exhibited the painting Jibo at the tenth annual Kyōdokai exhibition and began showing bijin-ga paintings at the Inten exhibition. His output was more modest than that of his contemporary Itō Shinsui: he designed twenty-one bijin-ga prints in the shin-hanga style between 1929 and 1934, published in ōban format first by Sakai & Kawaguchi, then, after 1931, by Kawaguchi alone, and finally by Ikeda; the designs were mostly carved by Maeda Kentarō and printed by Komatsu Wasakichi, and were marketed chiefly for sale in the United States. Notably, Kotondo never published with Watanabe Shōzaburō, the dominant shin-hanga publisher in the Tokyo area at the time; the reason is unknown, though it seems unlikely Watanabe would not have tried to secure a collaboration with him. which were sold in the United States. Seventeen of Kontodo's prints were shown at the seminal shin hanga exhibition at the Toledo Museum of Art in 1936.

Kotondo's bijin-ga are marked by a certain nostalgia: rather than fashionable beauties defiantly dressed in Western-influenced clothing and accessories, his subjects were modern women who still embraced traditional values, offering intimate glimpses of dress, make-up, hairstyle and manner that appealed to Japanese and Western connoisseurs alike, drawn to an image of old Japan that seemed to be disappearing in the 1930s.

His first published print, Keshō (1929), shows a woman in profile applying white cosmetic to her shoulder with a benevolent, impassive gaze; the indigo background sets off her pale skin and complements the pink fabric of her kimono, while a light pink tint on the face, arms and fingertips suggests the application of powder, the neck left uncoloured, and the bared shoulder, revealing a simplified suggestion of the breast, lends the print a subtle, discreet eroticism.

For Kamisuki (1929), depicting a crouching woman surrounded by bathhouse steam, the printer emphasised the volume of her body with near-luminous contour lines set against a dark blue ground printed with the baren sujizuri technique to suggest steam; a similar effect distinguishes Yuge (1929), whose title, meaning "steam", refers to the circular baren strokes of the background, lighter toward the top as if dissipating, behind a bather whose averted gaze and covering towel are typical of Kotondo's restrained treatment of the nude.

Authorities considered Kotondo's print Morning Hair of 1930 provocative and banned it after seventy of its hundred copies had sold and had the remaining thirty destroyed. In Yugaeri (1933), depicting a bijin in a light kimono passing through the curtained entrance of a public bath, Kotondo used his own wife as the model.

When Kiyotada died in 1941 Kotondo became the eighth head of the school and took the name Kiyotada V.

Kotondo lectured at Nihon University in Tokyo from 1966 to 1972. Collectors did not place a high value on Kotondo's prints while he was alive; the prints have since appreciated in collectability and fetch prices comparable to those of the great masters.

Works by Torii Kotondo

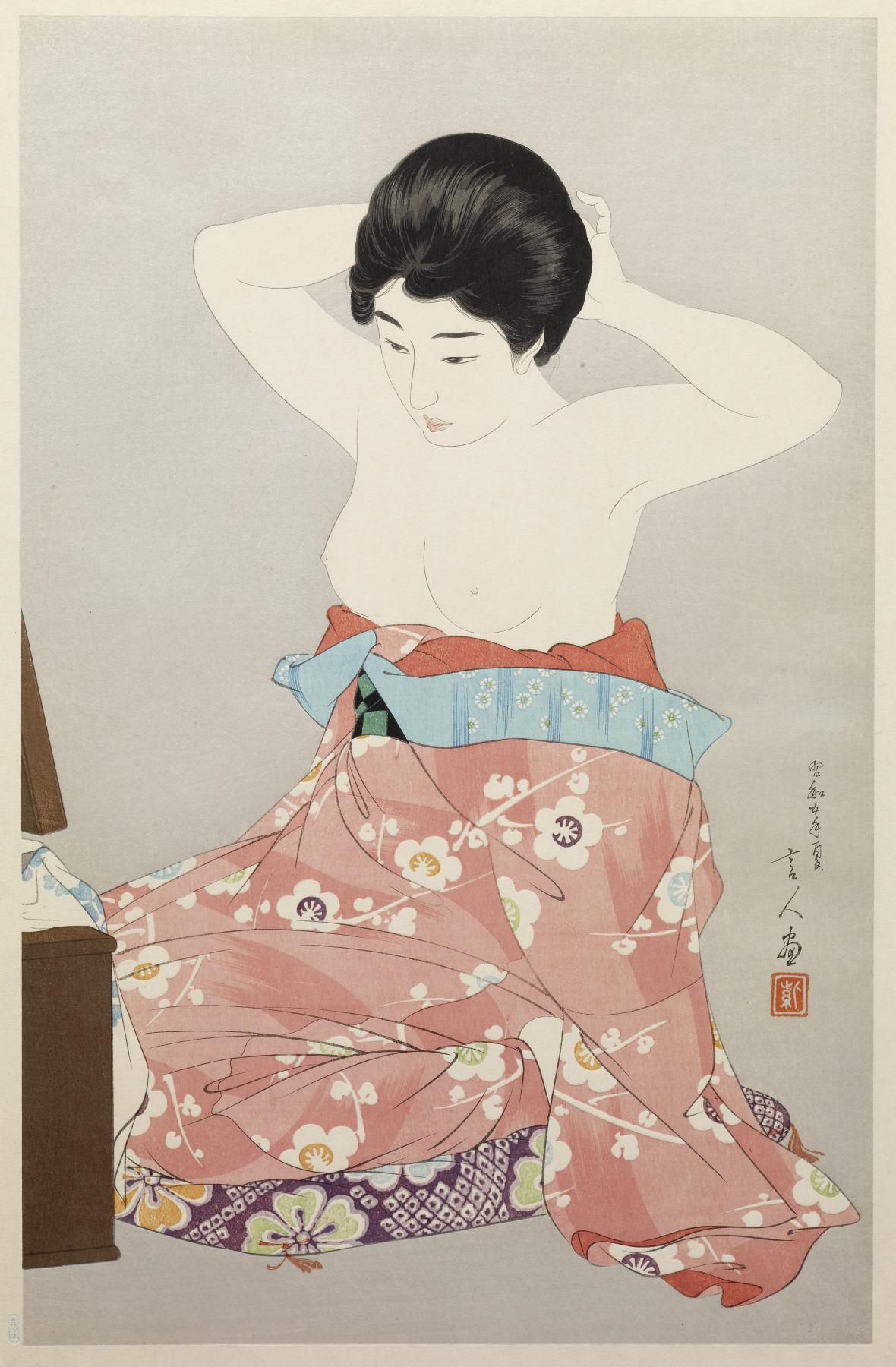

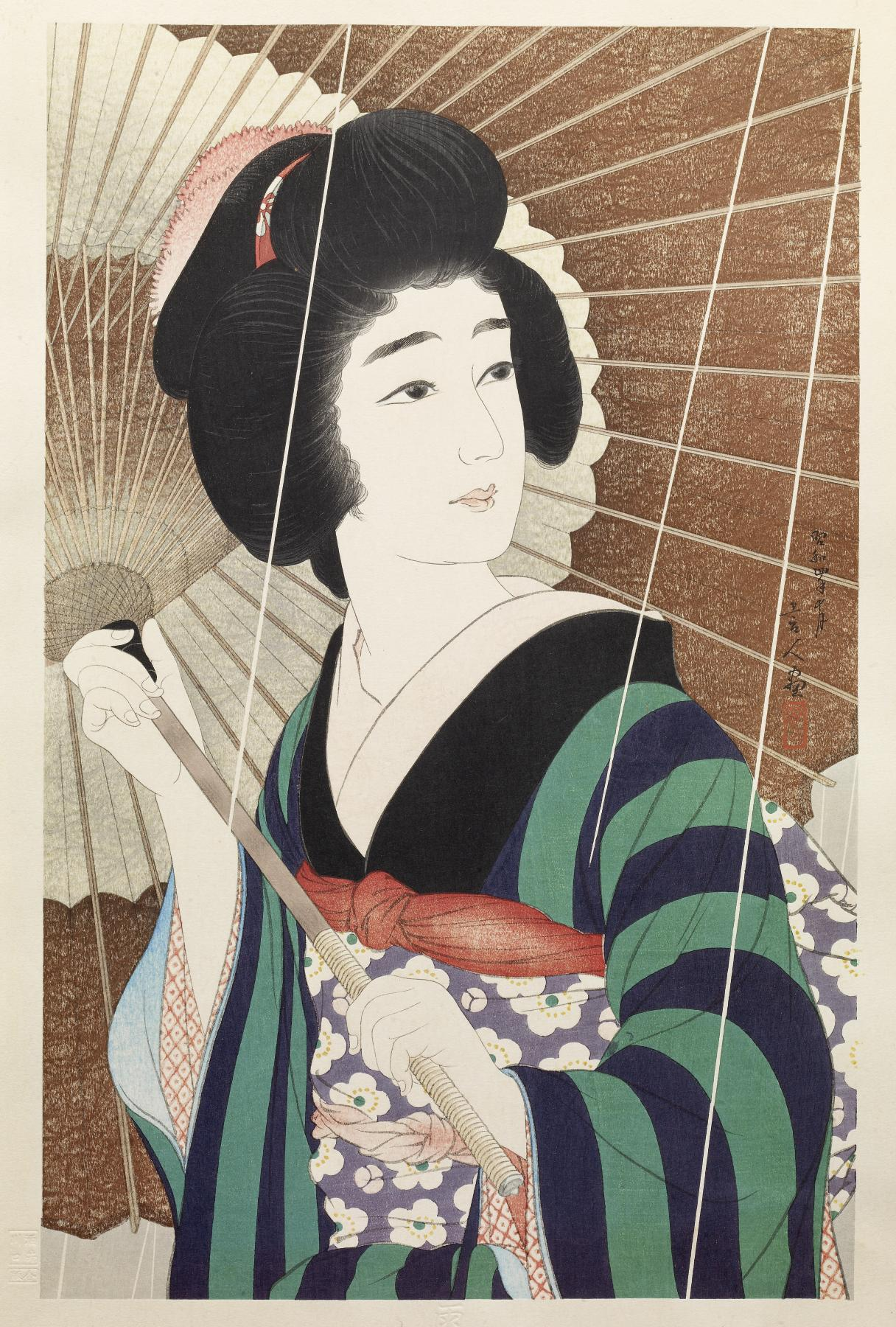

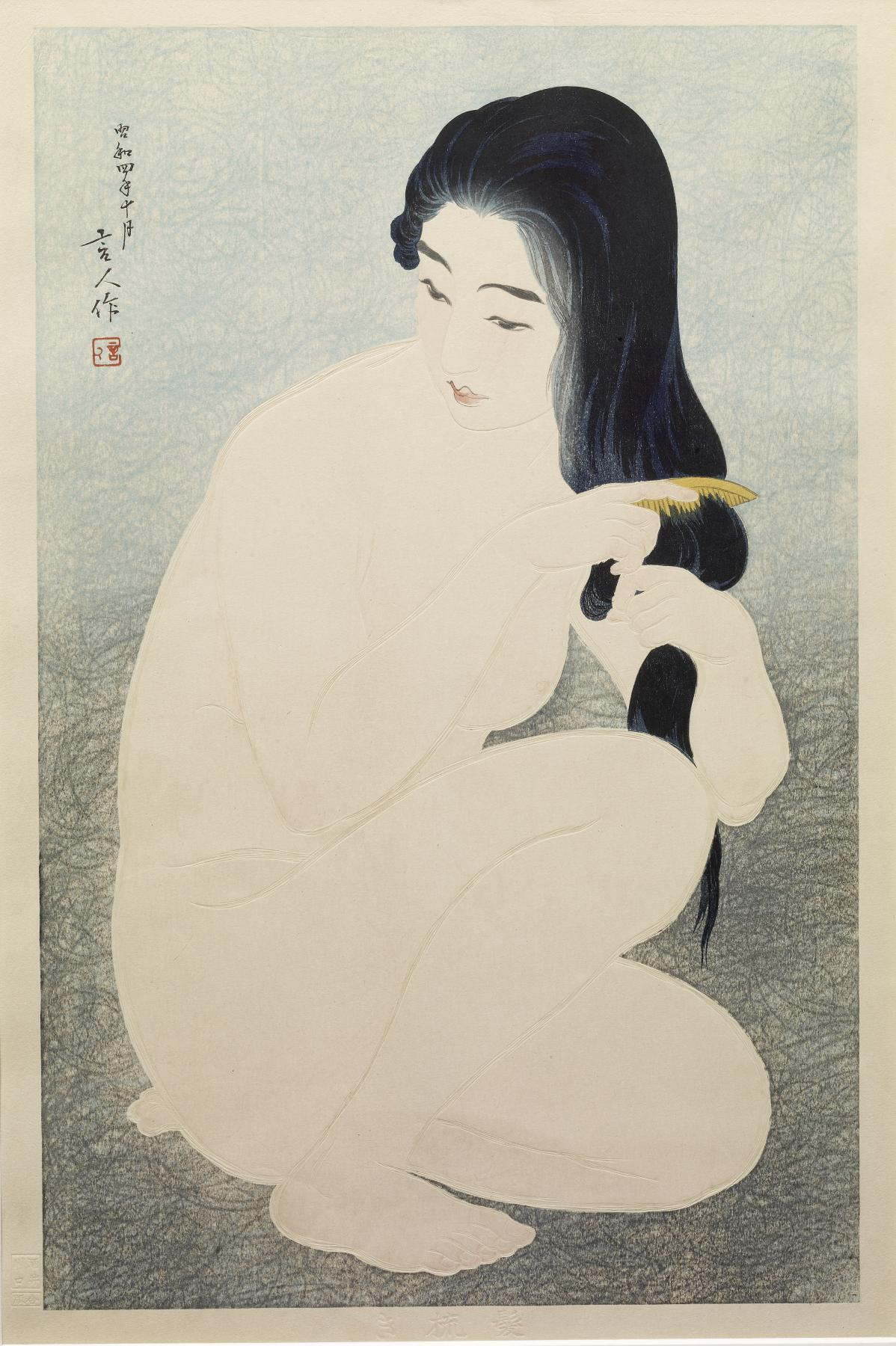

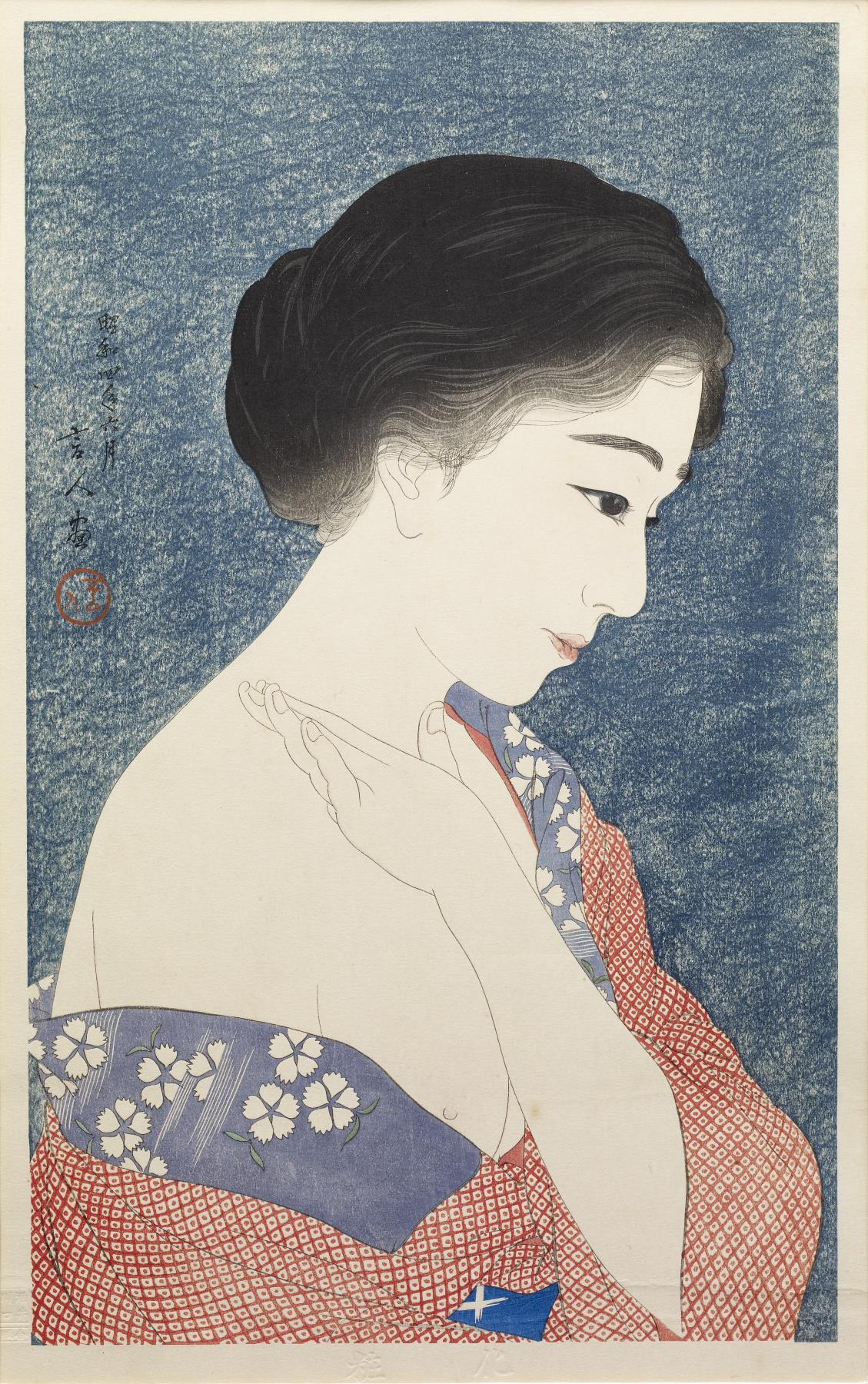

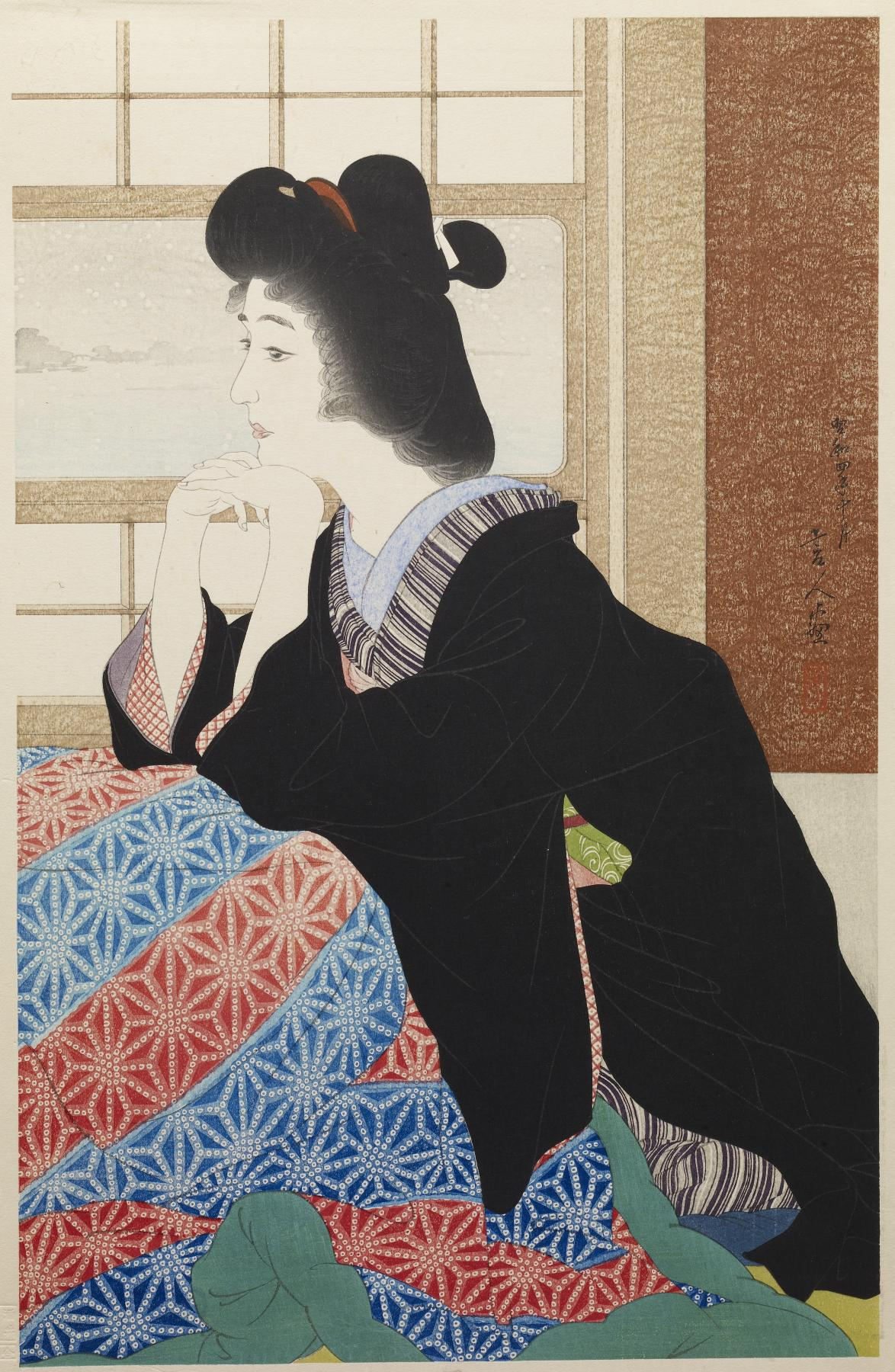

== Works cited ==
- Harris, Frederick (2011). Ukiyo-e: The Art of the Japanese Print. Tuttle Publishing. ISBN 978-4-8053-1098-4.
- Merritt, Helen; Yamada, Nanako (1995). Guide to Modern Japanese Woodblock Prints: 1900-1975. University of Hawaii Press. ISBN 978-0-8248-1732-9.
- Milone, Marco (2023). La xilografia giapponese moderno-contemporanea. Edizioni Clandestine. ISBN 978-88-6596-746-1.
