= Shiro Kasamatsu =

Japanese engraver and printmaker

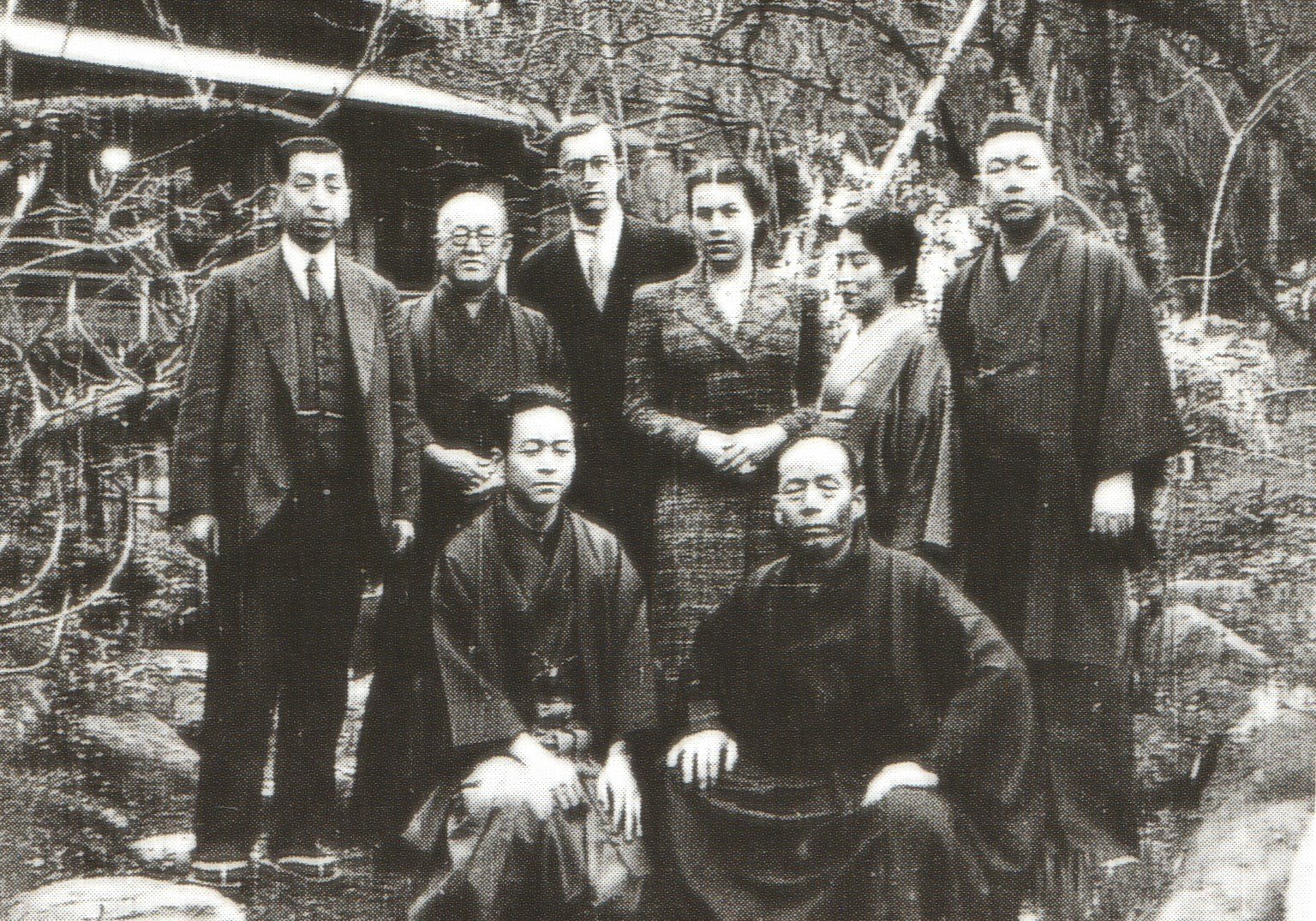
In the garden of artist Itō Shinsui’s Tokyo home. Left to right, back row: Moriyama Tesutaro (assistant to publisher Watanabe); Kawase Hasui, collector Robert O. Muller, Inge Muller, Itō Yoshiko and Itō Shinsui. Left to right, front row: Kasamatsu Shirō and publisher Watanabe Shōzaburō, April 1940

Shiro Kasamatsu (笠松 紫浪, Kasamatsu Shirō; 11 January 1898, Tokyo – 14 June 1991) was a Japanese engraver and print maker trained in the Shin-Hanga and Sōsaku-Hanga styles of woodblock printing.

Kasamatsu was born in Asakusa, Tokyo in 1898 and apprenticed at the age of 13 to Kaburagi Kiyokata (1878–1973), a traditional master of Bijin-ga, pictures of beautiful women. Kasamatsu however took an interest in landscape and was given the pseudonym Shiro by his teacher, which he used as a signature mark in his prints. Kasamatsu exhibited his paintings in the Bunten and Teiten, government sponsored juried exhibitions. Kasamatsu completed his first woodblock prints in 1919 for Shōzaburō Watanabe after the publisher saw his paintings on exhibit. Their collaboration began with the print Seiran Senzokuike Hachiman Jinja and continued until the end of the 1930s, during which Kasamatsu created more than fifty prints for Watanabe, chiefly landscapes, Noh masks and interior scenes. Unusually for a landscape artist, his designs were predominantly in the vertical format more typically associated with portraiture, whereas contemporaries such as Hasui, Shinsui and Hiroshi Yoshida produced a mix of vertical and horizontal compositions throughout their careers; a rare exception is Izusan Kaigan (1938), whose warm reddish-brown sepia tone suggests sunset along the peninsula, rendered with a minimum of line and an almost monochromatic palette in which the curve of a stone wall is echoed by a light band of cloud shapes along the top of the image. Among the most celebrated prints published with Watanabe is Kasumu Yūbe, Shinobazu Ikehata (1932), so successful it was reprinted several times in different colour combinations, notably an aozuri-e (blue-printed) version; the Toledo Museum's 1936 catalogue records that roughly twenty blocks and around twenty-five superimposed impressions were used for an edition of three hundred. The composition, in Hiroshige's manner, frames a misty view of a popular three-part pond in southern Ueno Park through an overhanging tree and drooping branches, drawing the viewer's eye and lending the print depth; the broken brushstrokes used for the water recall those of the French Impressionists, though the precision of the rest of the image argues against reading it as properly Impressionist, and the strongly developed sense of perspective can likewise be attributed to Western artistic influence. Onsen no Asa, Shinshū Nozawa (1933) is notable as one of the rare shin-hanga prints to show the interior of an onsen, depicted in summer with the building's roof left partly open to vent the steam from the hot water. Two further prints published by Watanabe in 1934, Asakusa Kannondō no Daichōchin and Haru no Yo, Ginza, became popular with art historians: the former invites comparison with Hiroshige's earlier Asakusa Kinryūzan (1856) from Meisho Edo Hyakkei, depicting the same ancient temple, whose surrounding entertainment district was largely destroyed in the Second World War; the latter shows Ginza's shopping and entertainment district at night in an unusual violet-blue palette suggesting artificial lighting, with crowds in both traditional kimono and Western dress, a backlit dance hall, a lantern advertising the geisha dance Azuma Odori, and a passer-by's sandalled feet glimpsed beneath a sushi stall's curtain.

Almost all the woodblocks were destroyed in a fire in Watanabe's print shop following the Great Kanto Earthquake of 1923. Around 50 prints were published by Watanabe by the late 1940s. In the 1930s Kasamatsu also took part in nihonga groups such as the Sengakai, the Tatsumi Gakai, the Seikinkai, founded by Itō Shinsui and Yamakawa Shūhō in 1939, and the Kyōdokai; his profile was raised further when fourteen of his prints were included in the second Exhibition of Modern Japanese Prints, held at the Toledo Museum of Art in January 1936. In 1939 he began the series Tōkyō Kinkō Hakkei no Uchi, but only four prints were published, most likely because of a deteriorating relationship with Watanabe: Kasamatsu wanted to assert his artistic freedom and experiment with sōsaku-hanga, which Watanabe, strict with his artists, would not accept. After the war Kasamatsu stopped working for Watanabe and began to partner with Unsodo in Kyoto, for whom he created a new series on the same theme starting in 1953 and continued until 1960, completing 102 prints, all in the shin-hanga style and mostly landscapes, the most celebrated depicting snow and passages of chiaroscuro. Early works for Unsodo, such as Nikkō, Yōmei-mon no Yuki (1952), show a clear stylistic difference from his Watanabe-period prints: Unsodo's carvers typically used somewhat thicker, more undulating key-block lines, giving the carving and printing a heavier appearance. After the war he also developed a distinctive style of ink painting, and began to print and publish on his own in the Sōsaku-Hanga style, producing nearly 80 Sōsaku-Hanga prints between 1955 and 1965, self-published and sold in small numbers into the 1970s; this development shows a parallel with his Kyoto contemporary Tokuriki, who likewise produced sōsaku-hanga while publishing shin-hanga work with Uchida and Unsodo, a common pattern, since shin-hanga prints provided a steady income while sōsaku-hanga work was more often treated as a hobby than a commercial activity. His sōsaku-hanga prints are more modern in style and show Western influence; their subjects, mostly fūkeiga, also include a number of kachōga, the playful inclusion of a cat in Negi no Hana is unlike anything in his earlier shin-hanga work, while Yukiguni (1959) renders its scene effectively with simple, thick, flowing lines and a restricted palette.

He died on 14 June 1991; a major retrospective, Kasamatsu Mokuhan Nihon Hyakkei: Kasamatsu Shirō Mokuhanga Ten, was held in 1996.

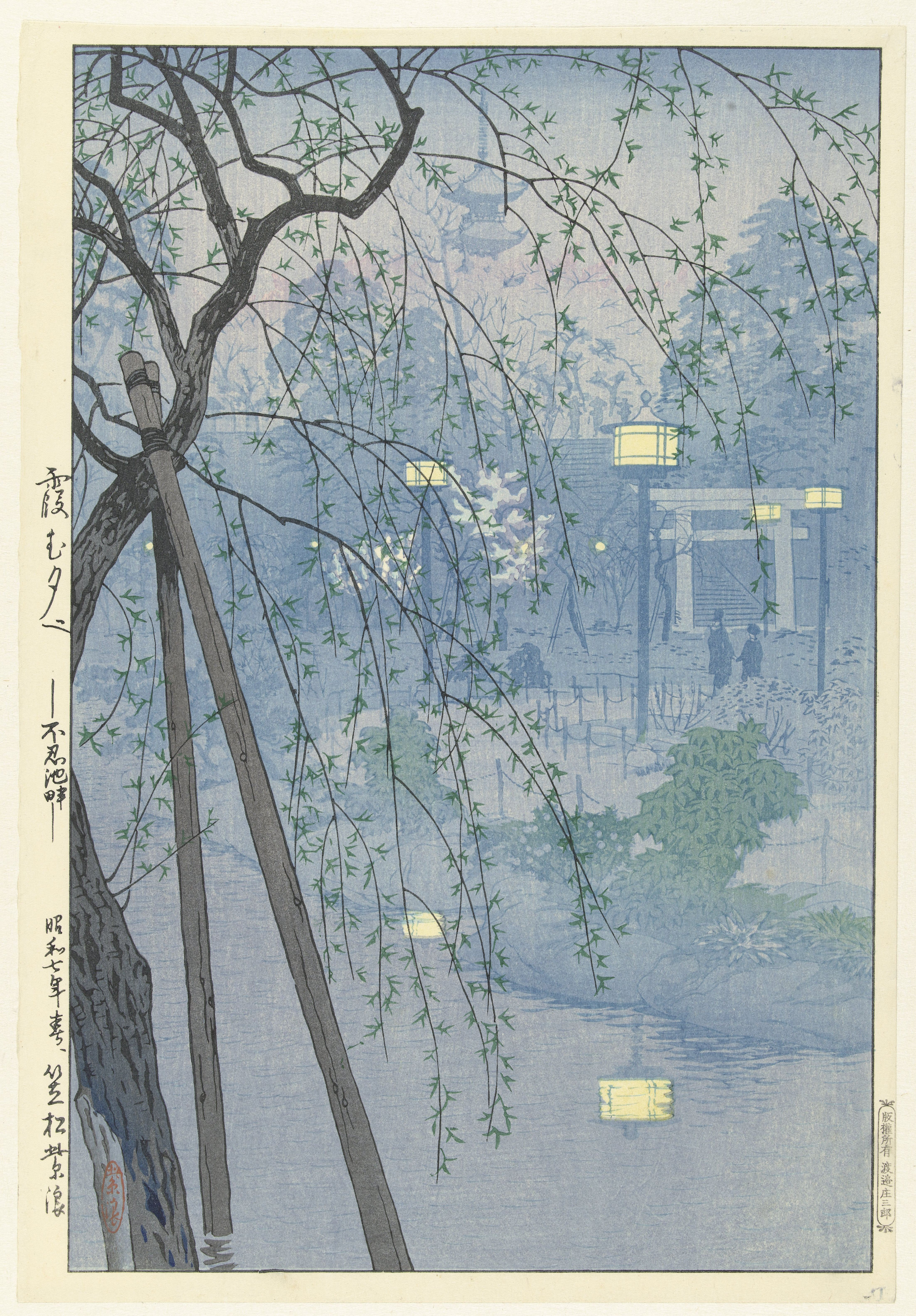
The edge of Shinobazu pond during a foggy evening, 1932

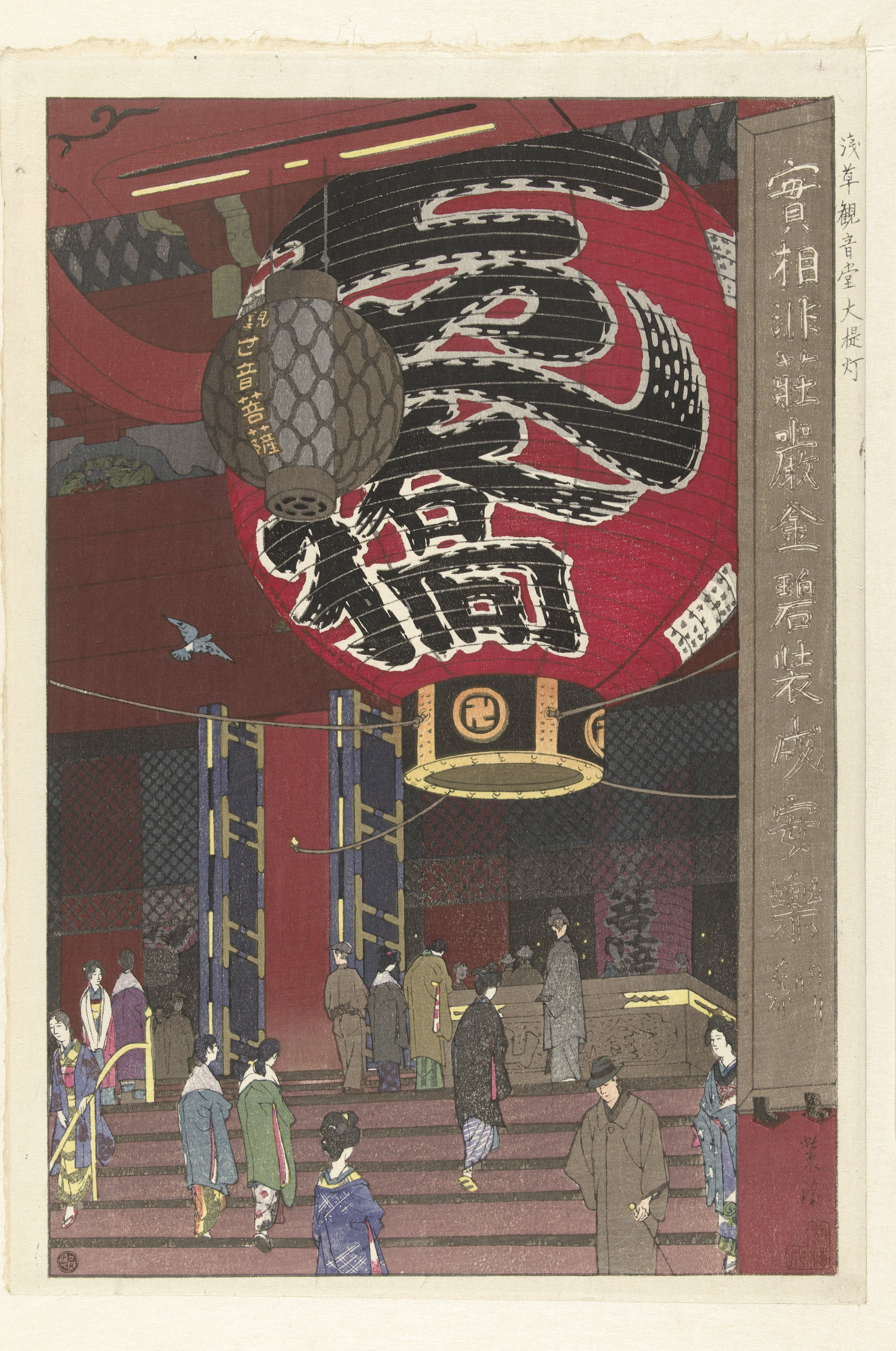
The Large Lantern in the Kannon Temple in Asakusa, woodblock print, 1934

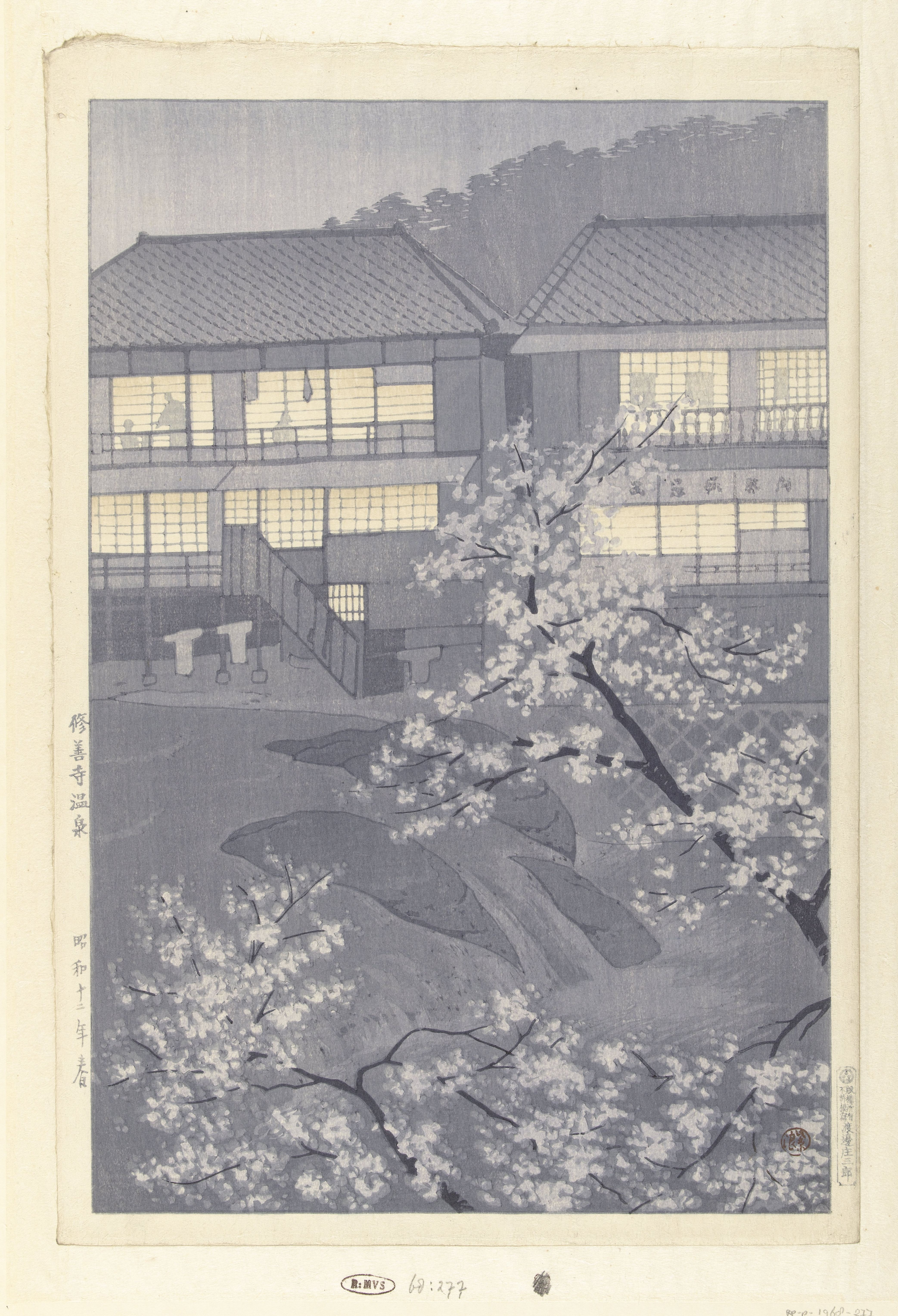
The hot springs of Shuzenji. Shuzenji onsen, 1937
