= Shōzaburō Watanabe =

Japanese print publisher

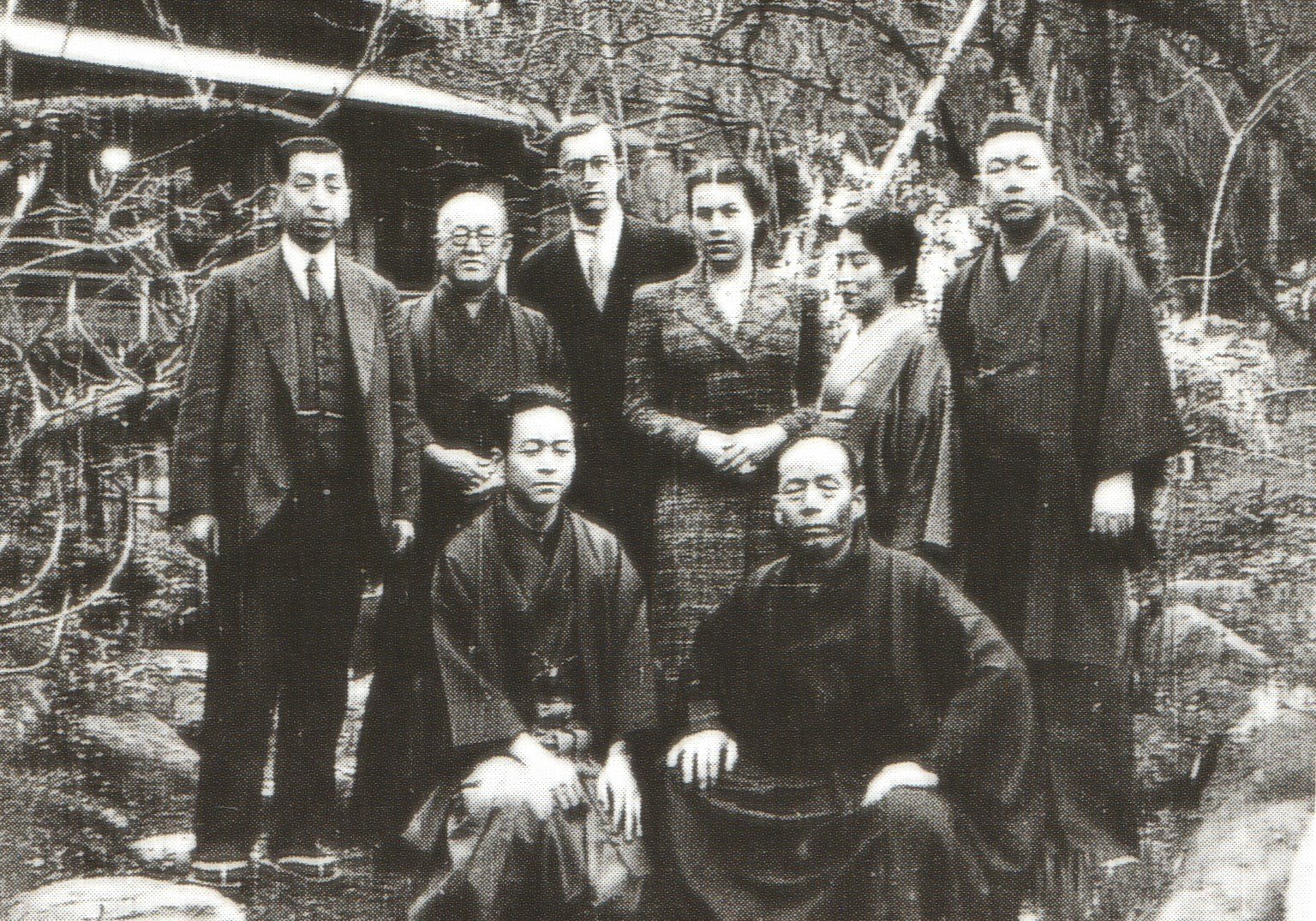
In the garden of artist Itō Shinsui’s Tokyo home. Left to right, back row: Moriyama Tesutaro (assistant to publisher Watanabe); Kawase Hasui, collector Robert O. Muller, Inge Muller, Itō Yoshiko and Itō Shinsui. Left to right, front row: Kasamatsu Shirō and publisher Watanabe Shōzaburō, April 1940

Shōzaburō Watanabe (渡辺 庄三郎, Watanabe Shōzaburō; June 2, 1885 – February 14, 1962) was a Japanese print publisher and the driving force behind one of the woodblock printmaking movements known as shin-hanga ("new prints").

== Biography ==
He started his career working for the export company of Kobayashi Bunshichi, which gave him an opportunity to learn about exporting art prints. In 1908, Watanabe married Chiyo, a daughter of the woodblock carver Chikamatsu.

Watanabe employed highly skilled carvers and printers, and commissioned artists to design prints that combined traditional Japanese techniques with elements of contemporary Western painting, such as perspective and shadows. Watanabe coined the term shin-hanga in 1915 to describe such prints. Friedrich Capelari, Hashiguchi Goyō, Charles W. Bartlett, Itō Shinsui, Kawase Hasui, Ito Takashi, Yoshida Hiroshi, Kasamatsu Shirō, Torii Kotondo, Ohara Koson, Tsuchiya Koitsu and Yamakawa Shūhō are among the artists whose works he published.

Much of his company's stockpile of both prints and their original printing-blocks was destroyed in the Great Kantō earthquake of 1923. In the following years, new versions of many of these prints were created, using re-carved blocks; typically, the re-issued "post-quake" prints included changes and revisions in the designs.

Watanabe exported most of his shin-hanga prints to the United States and Europe due to a lack of Japanese interest. After the close of World War II, his heirs continued the business, which still operates.

Watanabe designed two prints himself under the name "Kako": Sunset Glow at West Park in Fukuoka and Lake Kawaguchi.

Works

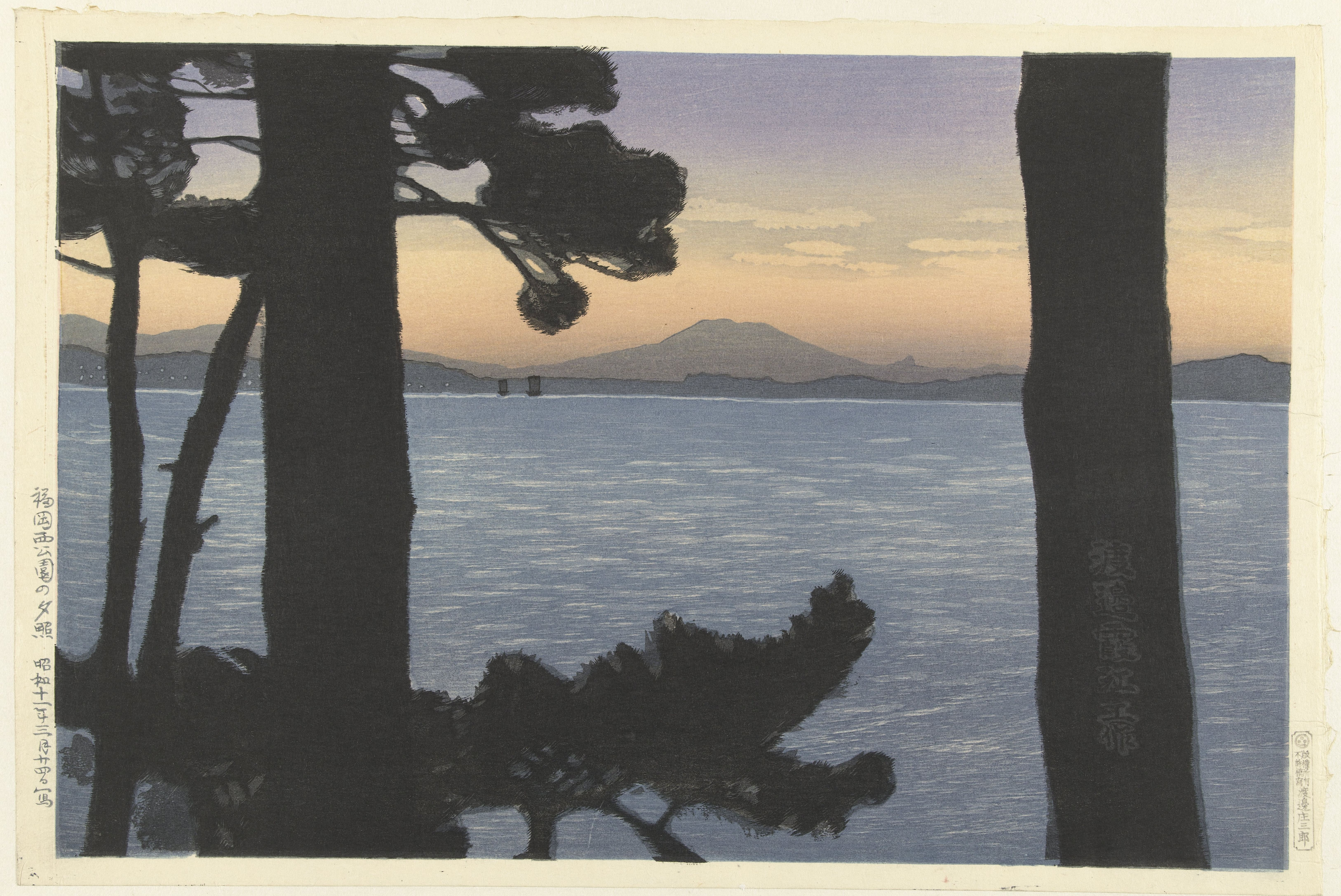
Sunset Glow at West Park in Fukuoka, 1936

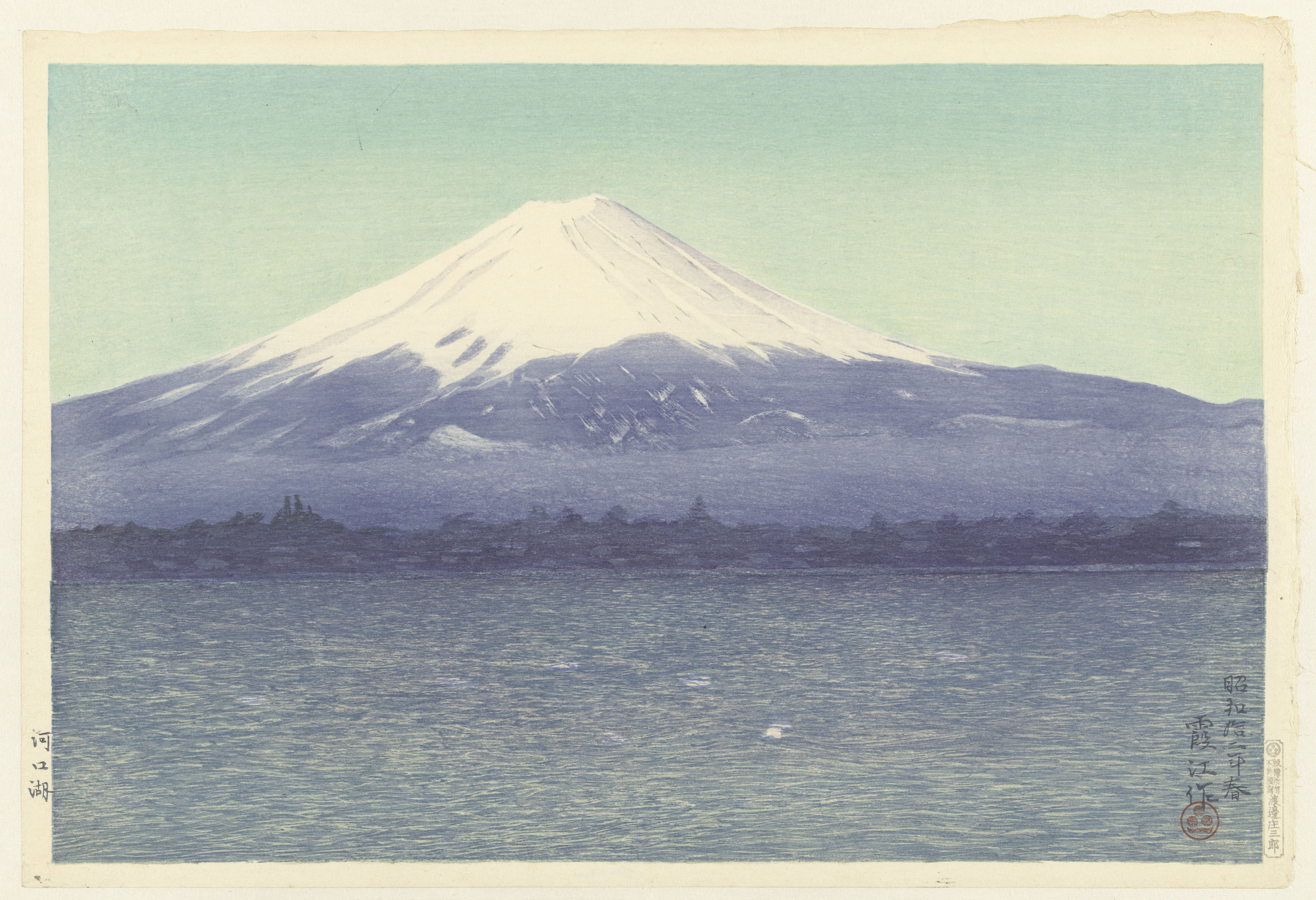
Lake Kawaguchi, 1937
