= Yamakawa Shūhō =

Japanese painter and printmaker

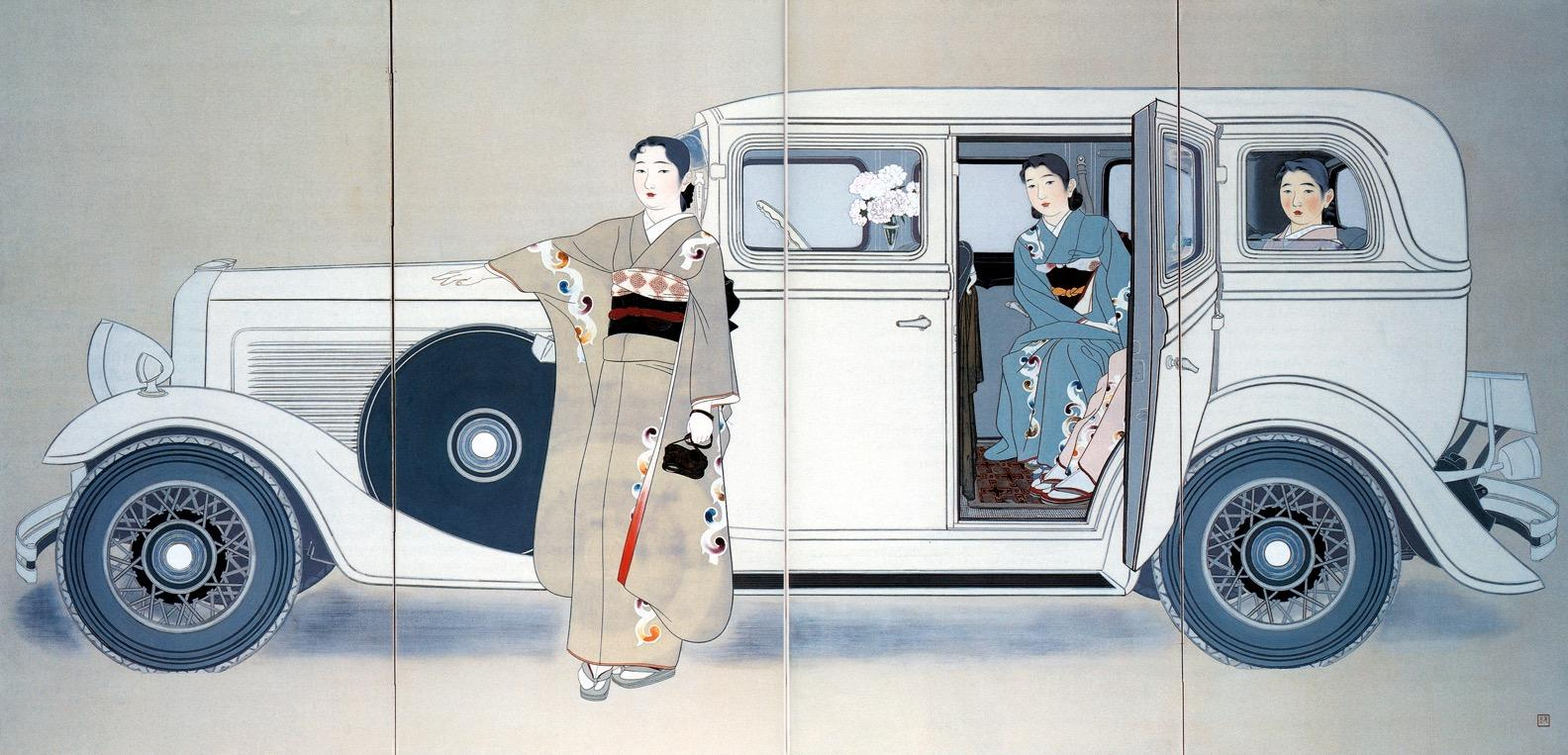
Three Sisters by Yamakawa Shūhō, 1936, Honolulu Museum of Art

Yamakawa Shūhō (山川 秀峰; 1898–1944) was a Japanese painter active in the Taishō and Shōwa eras, as well as a printmaker of the Shin-hanga movement. He was born in Kyoto with the name Yamakawa Yoshio. His first teacher, Ikegami Shūhō (1874-1944), gave him the name Yamakawa Shūhō. Yamakawa then went on to study with Kiyokata Kaburagi. He also worked as an illustrator in the 1930s. In the late 1920s, he started designing woodblocks prints of beautiful women, many of which were published by Shōzaburō Watanabe. Yamakawa died of a cerebral hemorrhage in 1944.

The Art Institute of Chicago and the Honolulu Museum of Art are among the public collections holding paintings by Yamakawa Shūhō.
