= Shinsui Itō =

Japanese artist (1898–1972)

Itō Shinsui
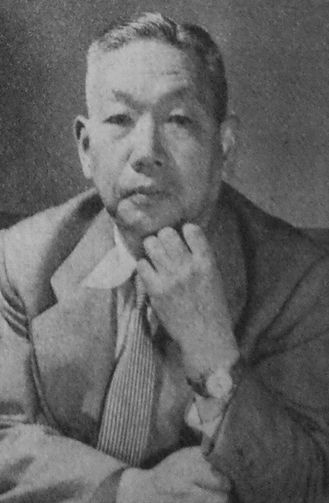
- Itō Shinsui circa 1954
- Born: Itō Hajime; 4 February 1898; Tokyo, Japan
- Died: 8 May 1972 (aged 74); Tokyo, Japan
- Known for: Painter, Woodcut artist
- Movement: Nihonga, Shin hanga
- Children: Yukiji Asaoka
- Awards: Living National Treasure; Order of the Rising Sun

Before the Mirror

The Fragrance of a Bath (1930)

Shinsui Itō (Japanese: 伊東 深水, romanized: Itō Shinsui; 4 February 1898 – 8 May 1972) was the pseudonym of a Nihonga painter and ukiyo-e woodblock print artist in Taishō- and Shōwa-period Japan. He was one of the great names of the shin-hanga art movement, which revitalized the traditional art after it began to decline with the advent of photography in the early 20th century. His real name was Itō Hajime (Japanese: 伊東 一).

== Biography ==
Itō was born in the Fukagawa district of Tokyo. After unwise investments bankrupted his father's business, he was forced to drop out of elementary school in the third grade and became a live-in apprentice at a printing shop. It was in this manner that he became interested in printing techniques and also in the arts.

In 1911, having been introduced to Kaburagi Kiyokata by the nihonga painter Yuki Somei, Itō was accepted as his apprentice, (who gave him the pseudonym of "Shinsui") and issued his first woodblock print the following year. His talent was soon apparent, and from the following year, his paintings were entered in public exhibitions.

In 1912, his works were first shown by the Tatsumi gakai ("Southeast Painting Society") and later works were displayed by the Kyodokai ("Homeland Society"), the Nihon bijutsuin (Japan Art Institute), and in the government sponsored Bunten show. His works were received with much praise by art critics, and his reputation was soon made. His early works won numerous awards, and he accepted a post at the Tokyo Nichi Nichi Shimbun to supply illustrations for newspapers.

As with most artists of the shin-hanga movement (notably Kawase Hasui), Itō was spotted by publisher Watanabe Shōzaburō, who effectively monopolized the market. In 1916, having recently turned his attention to young nihonga artists after his collaboration with Goyō Hashiguchi, Watanabe attended an exhibition of the Kyōdōkai, a society formed by Kiyokata Kaburagi's students, where he was struck by a painting by Itō titled Taikyo (1916), depicting a woman in a dark red kimono under-robe arranging her hair before a mirror absent from the composition; through Kaburagi, Watanabe proposed adapting the work into a print, and a few months later the homonymous print, known in English as "Before the Mirror", was published, beginning a collaboration that would last over forty years. Instead of using the harsh aniline red common in other contemporary prints, Itō used a natural vegetable dye, overprinting the robe several times to achieve a rich crimson color. Special care was also taken for the speckled gray texture background, making a contrast with the red garment, black hair, and white skin.

Itō came to be known as a specialist in the bijin-ga ("picture[s] of beautiful women") genre, although he also occasionally painted landscapes.

Itō's early landscape series, Eight Views of Lake Biwa inspired Kawase Hasui. His early bijin-ga are generally considered his finest works, including Twelve Figures of New Beauties (1922–1923).

Itō established his own independent studio in 1927. Although many of his early works were direct reflections of traditional ukiyo-e both in subject matter and in style, his technique was revolutionary. Ito would paint a "master painting" in watercolors, and dedicated craftsmen would make the actual prints from this "master copy". Itō was thus a pioneer in the shin-hanga movement. Watanabe and Itō continued their business cooperationuntil the publisher's death in 1962, and Watanabe exported thousands of Shinsui prints, generating great success for them both.

From 1937, Itō returned to an interest in landscape prints with the series Twelve Views of Ōshima; a trip to China in 1939 further encouraged this shift.

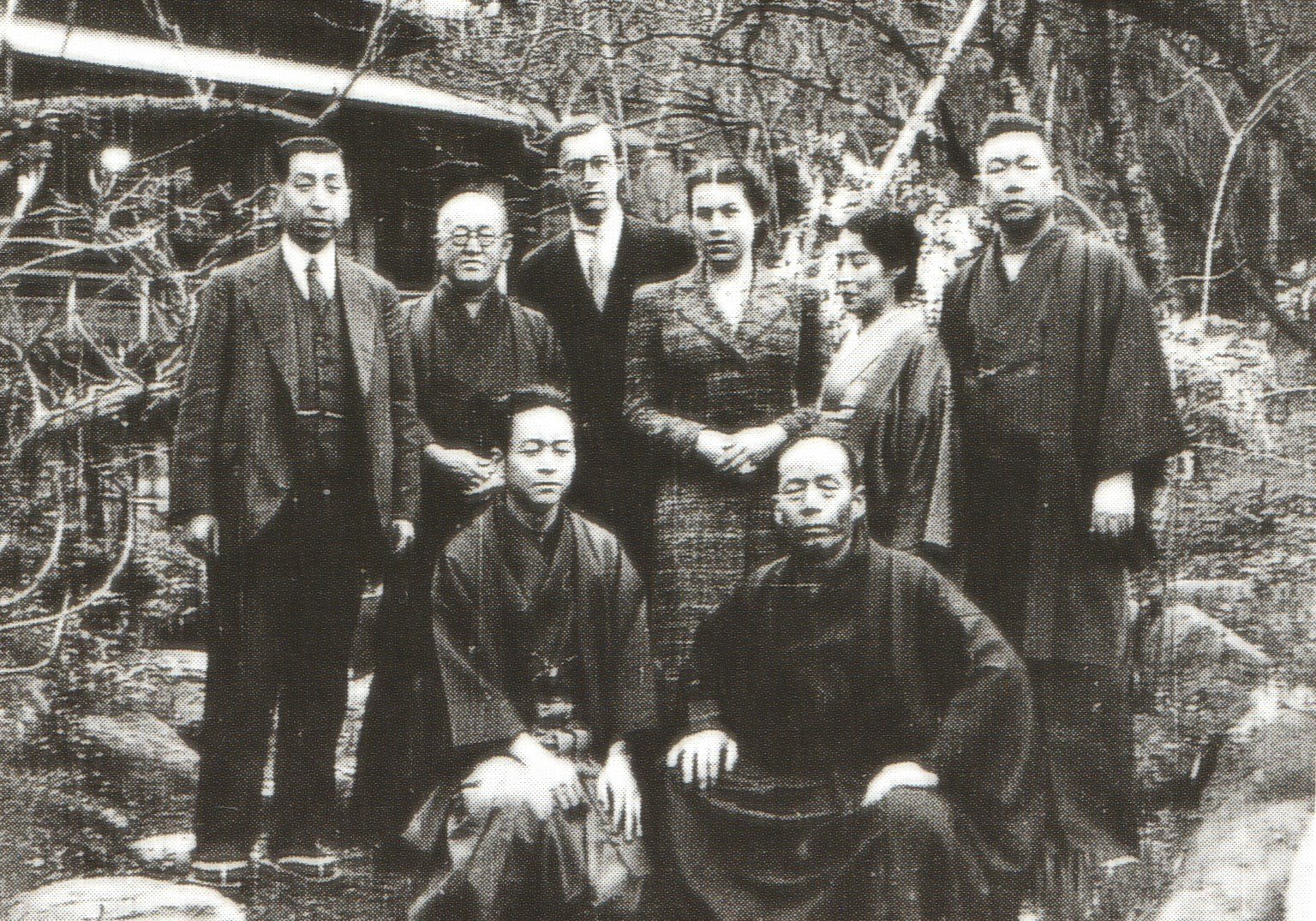
In the garden of Itō Shinsui’s Tokyo home. Left to right, back row: Moriyama Tesutaro (assistant to publisher Watanabe); Kawase Hasui, collector Robert O. Muller, Inge Muller, Itō Yoshiko and Itō Shinsui. Left to right, front row: Kasamatsu Shirō and publisher Watanabe Shōzaburō, April 1940

During the Pacific War, Itō was drafted by the Japanese government into producing propaganda art. He was sent to the South Pacific and Japanese-occupied Netherlands East Indies, and completed over 3000 sketches during his travels to various islands under Japanese rule. At the end of the war, he relocated from the ruins of Tokyo to Komoro in the mountains of Nagano Prefecture. He relocated from there to Kamakura, Kanagawa, in 1949.

In the post-war period Itō came to be regarded as one of the best known and respected personalities in Japanese society, and received several important honors during his lifetime. In 1952 the "Commission for the Protection of Cultural Properties" (Bunkazai Hōgō Iinkai) declared his woodblock designing talent to be of "intangible cultural properties" (mukei bunkazai) which was then the equivalent of being declared a Living National Treasure. In 1958, he became a member of the Japan Art Academy. In 1970, he received the Order of the Rising Sun.

One of Itō's works, Yubi, ("Finger") was the subject of the 1974 Philatelic Week commemorative postage stamp issued by the Japanese post office. Another work, Fubuki ("Blizzard") was depicted on a 1983 Japanese commemorative postage stamp as part of the Modern Japanese Arts series.

Itō's daughter, Yukiji Asaoka, is an actress and singer. Itō died in 1972 of cancer. His grave is at the temple of Ryūsō-in in Shinagawa, Tokyo.

== Notable prints ==
Yujo (1916) departs from Itō's usual depictions of courtesans by emphasizing emotional depth over physical beauty: the courtesan is shown slightly dishevelled and leaning forward, as if overcome by sadness and solitude, with the indigo blue of her outer kimono contrasting against a textured grey background.

Shoka no yoku (1922), regarded as the work that best reflects Western artistic influence in Itō's oeuvre, recalling the fullness and softness of figures by Renoir and Degas, depicts a nude woman veiled in steam, presumably in a public bath; despite the full nudity, the modest pose and atmosphere keep the print from being overtly erotic. Haru chikashi omoi ("Spring is Near", 1923) shows a woman touching her lips in a contemplative gesture recalling the title, set against an undecorated background; a wintry pine-branch pattern and heavy dark robes place the scene in winter, but butterflies on her hair ornament and cherry blossoms on her kimono hint at the approaching spring.

Mayuzumi (1928), a departure from Itō's typical bijin imagery showing an actress applying make-up backstage, achieved both critical and commercial success; its horizontal format, unusual for bijin prints, typically vertical, and its saturated red background reintroduce an erotic charge through the contrast with the actress's bare skin.

Between 1930 and 1931 Itō produced three series of twelve prints each, in which women embody a specific season. In the series Gendai bijinshu isshu, Gifu chōchin (1930) evokes summer through a woman in a cheerfully patterned yukata hanging a paper lantern of the type associated with the city of Gifu, while Kaya (1929) situates its scene in summer through a mosquito net and a floral-patterned yukata.

Fubuki ("Blizzard", 1932), from the series Gendai bijinshu dai nisshu, is unusually dynamic for Itō's otherwise static bijinga: it depicts a woman, presumably a geisha, sheltering from a snowstorm beneath a traditional umbrella, her pose conveying the effort of pushing against the wind. Yu no ka (1930), from the same period, depicts a nude woman bathing outdoors; despite the full nudity, its connection to the bathing theme and the traditional association of women with nature meant the print caused no controversy.

Kami ("Hair", 1952), printed from thirty-nine blocks on the occasion of Itō's designation as an intangible cultural property (mukei bunkazai) by the Bunkazai Hogo Iinkai, was based on a 1949 painting of the same title; the print differs from the original in its darker palette, the addition of a mica background, and the woman's figure placed fully in the foreground as she bends to rinse her hair.

Tekagami ("Hand Mirror", 1954) shows a woman in a kimono with a bold, near-cubist pattern of pink sections crossed by multicoloured lines, its geometric colour blocks producing an almost abstract effect; her hairstyle, a permanent wave, slightly different from that in vogue in the 1930s, identifies her as a modern woman of the 1950s.

== Major works ==
- Eight Views of Lake Biwa – 1917–1918
- Twelve Figures of New Beauties – 1922–1923
- Collection of Modern Beauties – 1929–1931
- Twelve Views of Ōshima – 1937–1938
- Three Views of Mount Fuji – 1938–1939
- Ten Views of Shinano – 1948
- Incense Party (聞香, Monkō) - 1950

His works are held in several museums worldwide, including the Virginia Museum of Fine Art, the Toledo Museum of Art, the Hiroshima Museum of Art, the Fine Arts Museums of San Francisco, the Minneapolis Institute of Art, the Museum of Fine Arts, Boston, the University of Michigan Museum of Art, the Indianapolis Museum of Art, the Hood Museum of Art, the Columbus Museum of Art, the Museum of Modern Art, Kamakura & Hayama, the Los Angeles County Museum of Art, the Brooklyn Museum, the Harvard Art Museums, and the British Museum.

== Further readings ==
Merritt, Helen and Nanako Yamada. (1995). Guide to Modern Japanese Woodblock Prints, 1900-1975. Honolulu: University of Hawaii Press. ISBN 9780824817329; ISBN 9780824812867; OCLC 247995392
