= Kiyokata Kaburagi =

Japanese Nihonga artist (1878–1972)

Kiyokata Kaburaki
- 鏑木 清方
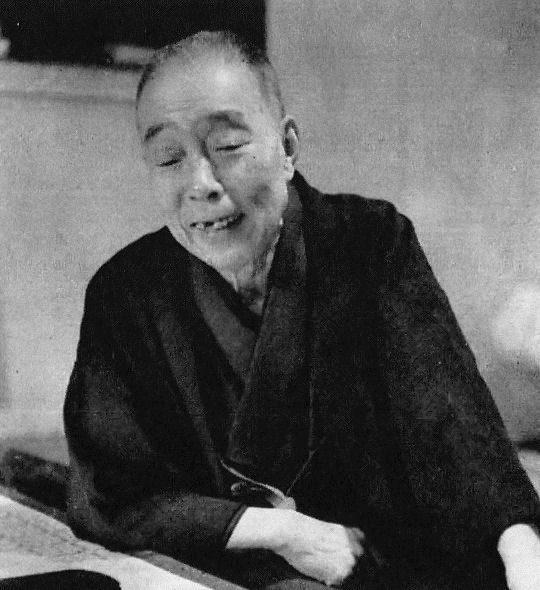
- Kiyokata Kaburaki in November 1954
- Born: Kaburaki Ken-ichi; August 31, 1878; Tokyo, Japan
- Died: March 2, 1972 (aged 93); Kamakura, Kanagawa, Japan
- Resting place: Yanaka Cemetery, Tokyo
- Known for: Painter
- Movement: Nihonga, Bijinga
- Awards: Order of Culture

Kiyokata Kaburaki (鏑木 清方, Kaburaki Kiyokata; August 31, 1878 – March 2, 1972) was the art-name of a Nihonga artist and the leading master of the bijin-ga genre in the Taishō and Shōwa eras. His legal name was Kaburaki Ken'ichi. The artist himself used the reading "Kaburaki", but many Western (and some Japanese) sources transliterate it as "Kaburagi".

== Biography ==
Kaburaki was born in Kanda district of Tokyo to an affluent and literate family. His father was a novelist-journalist; the founder and president of the Tokyo Nichi Nichi Shimbun newspaper, and a writer of popular novels. In 1891, at the age of 13, Kaburaki was sent to become a pupil of the ukiyo-e artists Mizuno Toshikata and Taiso Yoshitoshi. His first job was as an illustrator for Yamato Shinbun, a Tokyo newspaper founded by his father. When he was sixteen, his father went bankrupt and the family had to sell their home.

Kaburaki initially made his living as an illustrator, producing frontispiece illustrations called kuchi-e, illustrating the titles of popular novels. His works were highly praised by noted author Kyōka Izumi, who insisted that his novels be illustrated by Kaburaki. However, Kaburaki's first and foremost interest was in painting. In 1901, he helped create the Ugokai (烏合会), an art group dedicated to reviving and popularizing the bijin-ga (images of beautiful women) genre. When the government-sponsored Bunten exhibitions were started in 1907, he began to paint full-time, winning several prizes.

In 1915, his work Murasame won first prize at the 9th Bunten Exhibition.

In 1917, together with Hirafuku Hyakusui, Matsuoka Eikyu, Kikkawa Reika and Yuki Somei, he helped found the Kinreisha, a Nihonga association training promising young artists, including Kawase Hasui. When Watanabe Shōzaburō started an export woodcut print business, he needed many talented artists to make print designs appealing to western audiences. Kaburaki's group became a recruiting center for Watanabe. Kaburaki organized exhibitions with works of his students and introduced his best students to Watanabe. Next to Watanabe himself, it was probably Kiyokata Kaburaki, who had the greatest influence on the development and promotion of the shin-hanga ("new prints") movement. Alongside Kawase Hasui, artists such as Itō Shinsui, Ito Takashi, Shiro Kasamasu, Yamakawa Shūhō, Torii Kotondo and Terashima Shimei were trained by Kaburaki and then introduced to Watanabe.

When Kaburaki had reached his late 40s, he was well established and a highly respected artist. In 1929 he became a member of the Imperial Fine Art Academy (Teikoku Bijutsuin). His portrait of rakugo actor San'yūtei Enchō (1930) has been registered as an Important Cultural Property (ICP) by the Agency for Cultural Affairs. In 1938 he was appointed to the Art Committee of the Imperial Household. He received the official position of court painter in 1944. In 1946, he was asked to be one of the judges for the first post-war Nitten Exhibition. In 1954, he received the Order of Culture.

His house in Tokyo was burned down during the firebombing of Tokyo in World War II, and he relocated to Kamakura, Kanagawa Prefecture, where he lived until his death.

Kaburaki died in 1972 at the age of 93. His grave is at the Yanaka Cemetery in Tokyo. His house in Kamakura has been transformed into the Kaburaki Kiyokata Memorial Museum, displaying many of his works, and preserving his studio.

== Philately ==
Two of Kaburaki's works have been selected as the subject of commemorative postage stamps by the Japanese government:

- 1971: Tsukiji Akashimachi (1927), for the 1971 Philatelic Week
- 1980: Ichiba (1940), as part of the Modern Art series
