= Yukiji Asaoka =

Japanese singer and actress (1935–2018)

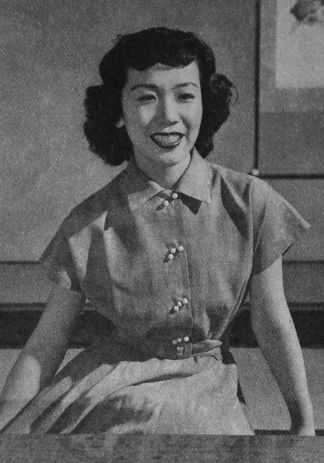
- Yukiji Asaoka in 1954
- Born: 23 July 1935
- Died: 27 April 2018 (aged 82)
- Occupation: Actress
- Spouse: Masahiko Tsugawa (m. 1973–2018)
- Father: Shinsui Itō

Yukiji Asaoka (朝丘 雪路, Asaoka Yukiji, 23 July 1935 – 27 April 2018) was a Japanese singer and an actress from Chūō, Tokyo. She was the daughter of a famous Japanese painter of shin hanga style prints, Shinsui Itō, and her second husband was actor Masahiko Tsugawa.

Asaoka was in the Takarazuka Revue from 1952 to 1955. She was a cast member (musumeyaku), belonging to the Moon Troupe (Tsuki).

She was famous for her roles in Japanese television series and appeared starring opposite Shintaro Katsu in both a film from the Zatoichi series and in the first film of the Hanzo the Razor trilogy. She was, however, mostly famous for her singing. She was also a voice actor in the 1999 anime film My Neighbors the Yamadas directed by Isao Takahata.

She died of Alzheimer's disease.

== Filmography ==
List of acting performances in film and television

Year	Title	Japanese	Romanization	Role	Notes
1955	Jazz on Parade: Jazz musume kampai!			Machiko	
1956			Senmanchôja no koibito yori: Odoru matenrô	Ruriko Nakata	
1958			Me no kabe		
1959			Aru rakujitsu	Asami Nukata	
1960			Arashi o yobu gakudan	Setsuko Ogata	
1960			Taiyô o dake	Chikako Kuni	
1964			Akumyo daiko	Hiroko	
1965			Waka oyabun	Kyoko	
1965			Waka oyabun shutsugoku	Kyoko Nakatsu	
1966			Arashi o yobu otoko		
1967	Zatoichi Challenged	座頭市血煙り街道	Zatōichi chikemurikaidō	Tomoe	
1972	Hanzo the Razor: Sword of Justice	御用牙	Goyôkiba	Omino	
1973			Hissatsu shiokinin	Onami	TV series, one episode: "Raku areba ku ari oya wa nashi"
1974			Honô no shôzô		
1974-1978			Zatôichi monogatari		TV series, two episodes: "Pouring Rain" (1974) "Spring Arrives for the Eyeless Daruma" (1978)
1978			Kaerazaru hibi	Kayo Nozaki	
1982			Munasawagi no hôkago	Satoko kuwata	
1982			Daiamondo wa kizutsukanai	Machiko Mimura	
1982	Tora-san, the Expert	男はつらいよ 花も嵐も寅次郎	Otoko wa Tsurai yo: Hana mo Arashi mo Torajirō	Momoe	
1983	Time and Tide	時代屋の女房	Jidaiya no nyōbo	Kikuchi Matsue	
1983			Meiso chizu	Sayuri Hoshi	
1987			Za samurai	Chimatsu Shizu, Takeshi's mother	
1990			Oazuke	Yumi's Mother	
1995		藏	Kura	Masae Tanimura	
1999	My Neighbors the Yamadas	ホーホケキョとなりの山田くん	Hōhokekyo Tonari no Yamada-kun	Matsuko Yamada	Voice
2003			Izu Kanazawa Saigayaki satsujin jiken		TV movie
2005			Onsen maruhi daisakusen 2	Seiko Shindô	TV movie
2005			Koto		TV movie
2006			Onsen maruhi daisakusen! 3	Seiko Shindô	TV movie
2008	Samurai Gangsters			Tazaemon's wife	
2013	The Tale of Princess Kaguya	かぐや姫の物語	Kaguya-hime no Monogatari		Voice
2014			Zenijo	Owner	TV movie
