= Furuya Kōrin =

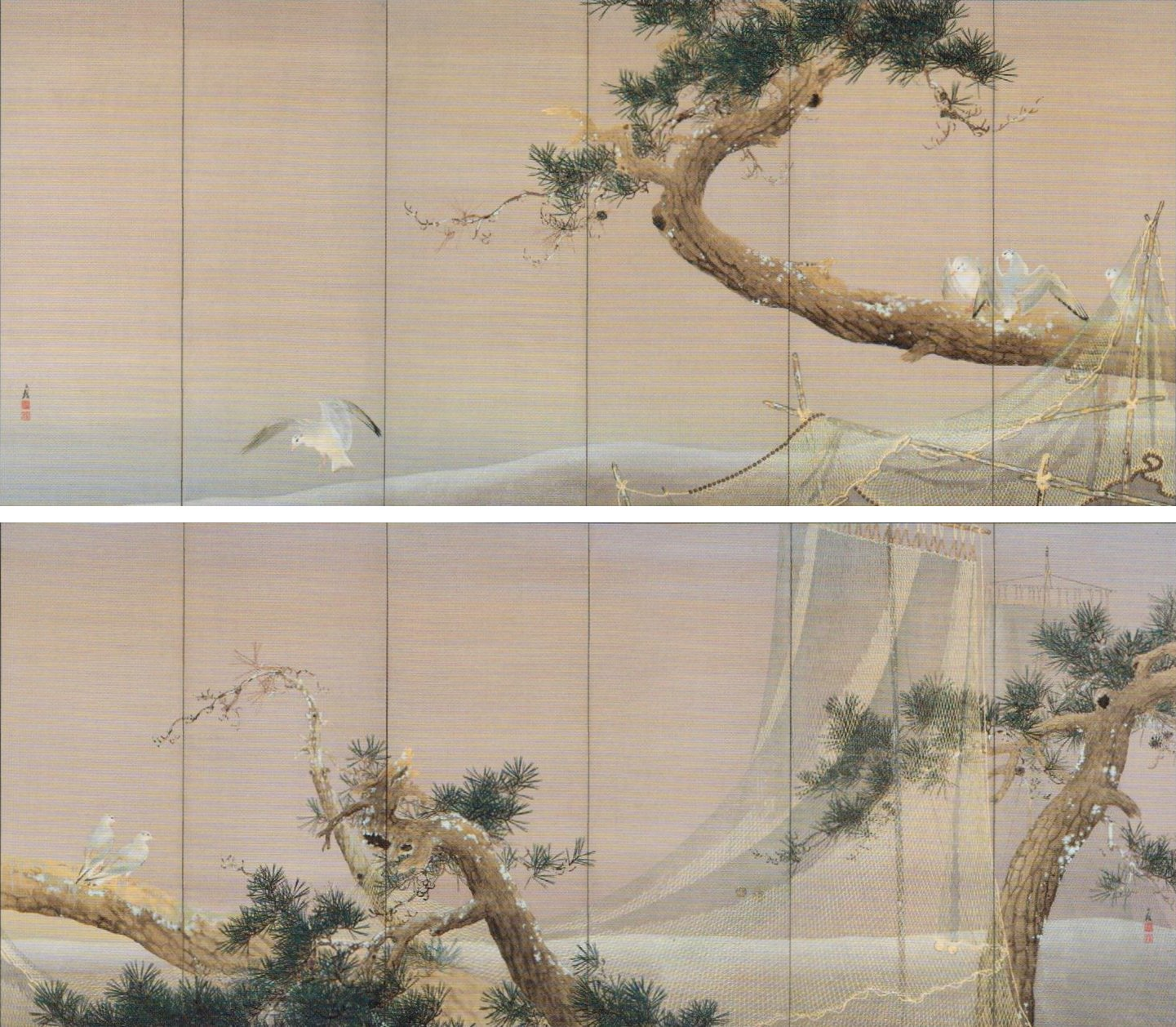
Shoreline at Dusk by Furuya Kōrin (1910)

Furuya Kōrin (古谷紅麟; also known as Kōrin Furuya, Furutani Kōrin, 1875–1910) was a Japanese artist, illustrator, and designer active in the Kyoto arts and crafts circle in the Meiji period of the late 19th and early 20th centuries. His pseudonym references Ogata Kōrin (1658–1716), also from Kyoto, and he described himself as a "Kōrin of the modern age".

== Biography ==
Born in Kaizu, Shiga Prefecture in 1875, Kōrin studied with Suzuki Mannen, Kamisaka Sekka and Asai Chu. He won the painting category of the Shinko Bijutsu Tenrankai (Exhibition of New and Old Art) in 1897. He taught at the Kyoto Municipal School of Arts and Crafts from 1905, being appointed an assistant professor before his death in 1910.

Among his works are popular illustrated books in the Rinpa tradition. Kōrin Patterns (Kōrin moyō) (1907), a two-volume, ink-on-paper work originally conceived as a sample book for the kimono industry, became popular with people interested in fashion. John T. Carpenter of the Metropolitan Museum of Art describes the book as "impressive". It contains images based on wave patterns as well as the traditional boatman in a skiff. Other works published by Yamada Unsōdō include several orihon (concertina-type binding) books with patterns based on flowers and plants (1905), pine trees (1905) and bamboo (1907).

His works are held in the Metropolitan Museum of Art, New York, the British Museum, London, and the Rijksmuseum, Amsterdam.
