= Goyō Hashiguchi =

Japanese artist (1880–1921)

- 橋口 五葉
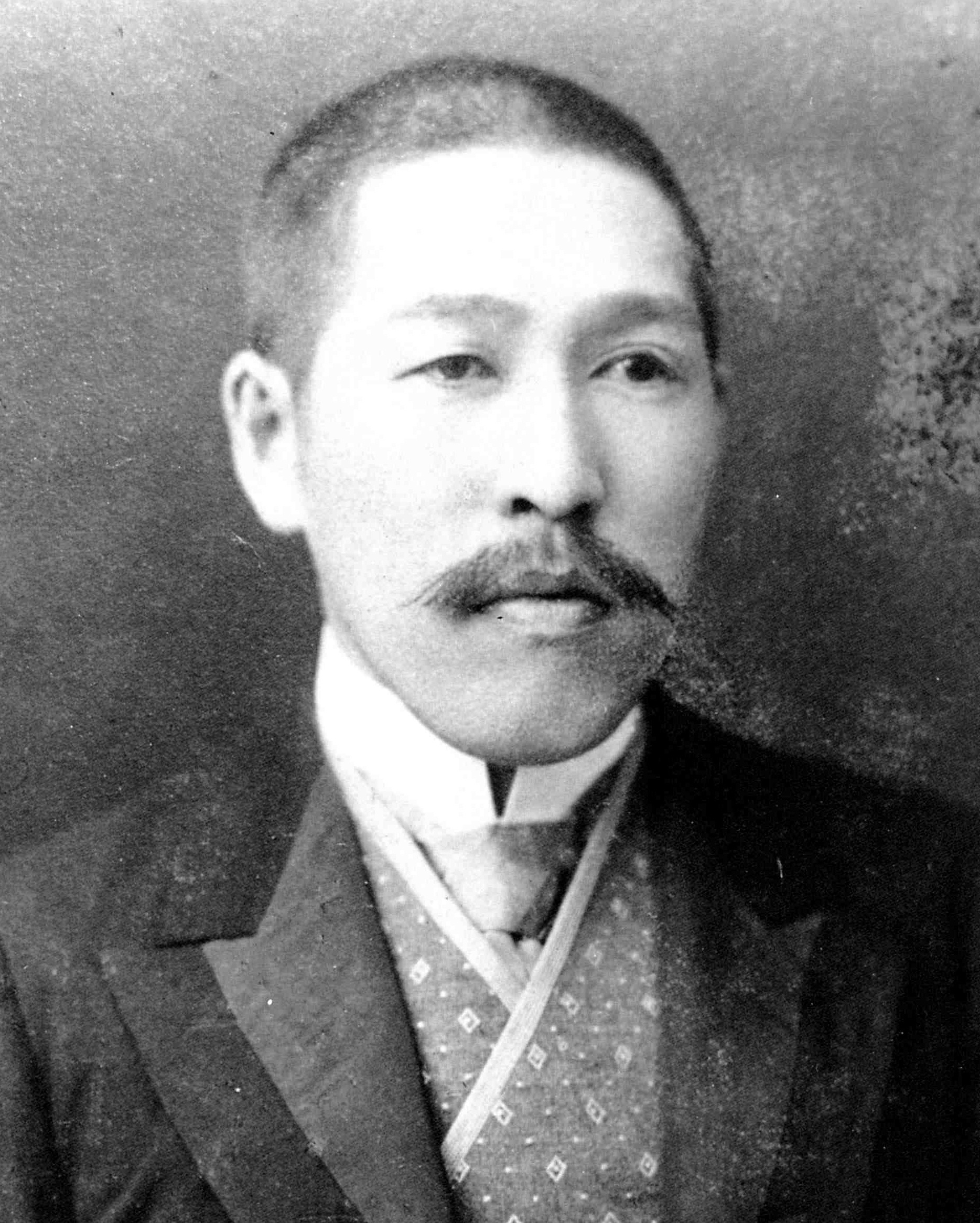
- Born: Kiyoshi Hashiguchi; December 21, 1880; Kagoshima Prefecture, Japan
- Died: February 24, 1921 (aged 40)
- Movement: shin-hanga

Goyō Hashiguchi (橋口 五葉, Hashiguchi Goyō; December 21, 1880 – February 24, 1921) was a Japanese artist. At the forefront of the shin-hanga ("new prints") movement, a revival of ukiyo-e, he designed fourteen woodblock prints which are regarded as masterpieces of the genre.

== Early life ==
Hashiguchi Kiyoshi was born in Kagoshima Prefecture. His father Hashiguchi Kanemizu was a samurai and amateur painter in the Shijō style. His father hired a teacher in the Kano style of painting in 1899 when Kiyoshi was ten. Kiyoshi took the name Goyō while attending the Tokyo School of Fine Arts, from which he graduated best in his class in 1905. The name Goyō was chosen because of his fondness for the five needle pine in his father's garden.

== Early career ==
His first commission was designing the layout and illustrations for Natsume Sōseki's novel I Am a Cat in 1905. This led to design of other books by Futabatei Shimei, Uchida Roan, Morita Sōhei, Jun'ichirō Tanizaki, Nagai Kafū, and Kyōka Izumi.

In 1907 Goyō won recognition for an ukiyo-e oil painting in the first Bunten show, but was disappointed in the unenthusiastic public acceptance of his oil paintings in future shows. In 1911 he again won recognition for an ukiyo-e poster designed for the Mitsukoshi department store. Goyō became a serious student of ukiyo-e and studied books, originals and reproductions. He was especially interested in the great classical ukiyo-e artists and wrote several articles about Utamaro, Hiroshige and Harunobu. From 1914, while frail and suffering from beriberi, he contributed articles on various ukiyo-e studies to Art News (Bijutsu-shinpō) and Ukiyo-e magazine.

== Defining works ==
In 1915, urged by the shin-hanga publisher Shōzaburō Watanabe, he designed a print for artisans to produce under Watanabe's direction. Goyō designed "Bathing" (Yuami), Watanabe wanted to continue the collaboration but Goyō had other plans. The trial seal (shisaku) that Goyō affixed to Yuami hints at his hesitation toward the style Watanabe had proposed, and he reportedly remained dissatisfied with the print: although the edition of one hundred impressions was divided equally between artist and publisher, Goyō destroyed the copies that were his to keep. Instead, he worked in 1916–17 as supervisor of reproductions for 12 volumes called "Japanese Color Prints" (Yamato nishiki-e) and in the process became thoroughly familiar with the functions of artisan carvers and printers. At the same time he was drawing from live models. From 1918 until his death he personally supervised the carving, printing, and publication of his own works, producing thirteen more prints – four landscapes, one nature print depicting ducks and eight prints of women. His total production, including "Bathing", numbers fourteen prints. (After his death a few more of his designs were developed into prints by his heirs.)

=== Keshō no onna and the legacy of Utamaro ===
Between 1916 and 1917 Goyō supervised Ukiyo-e fūzoku Yamato nishiki-e, a twelve-volume set reproducing hundreds of small-format facsimiles of works by early ukiyo-e masters, and in the same years he wrote scholarly articles on Hiroshige, Utamaro and Harunobu. Drawing on this research, he gathered leading carvers and printers to recreate roughly two hundred classical woodblock designs, a project completed only after three more years of work. In April 1918, once the reproductions were finished, he published Keshō no onna ("Woman Applying Powder"), the first print he designed, carved and printed under his own independent supervision, with carving by Takano Shichinosuke and Koike Masazō and printing by Maeda Kentarō.

The print's debt to the Kansei-era (1789–1801) masters, and to Utamaro in particular, is evident in its rich mica ground and its close, sensual framing of a bathing woman; the unusual ōban composition was directly inspired by an eponymous 1795 print by Utamaro, though critics have read it as an epitome of the modern woman of the Taishō era (1912–1926). Both designs share a similarly rotated three-quarter view and depict a woman applying make-up to her neck and shoulders; Goyō's figure uses a brush where Utamaro's uses her fingers, yet the differences are as significant as the similarities: Goyō relied on an explicit, frontal sensuality, while Utamaro's print centred on the eroticism of the exposed nape, and Goyō's figure shows a more naturalistic volume and an individualized physiognomy shaped by Western pictorial conventions, in contrast to the idealized, typified beauties of Utamaro's own period.

In Kami sukeru onna ("Woman Combing Her Hair", 1920), Goyō departed from the convention of bijin-ga hairstyling by portraying his subject with her hair loose rather than elaborately dressed, shifting the technical challenge from the hairline to the full length of the strands; carver and printer achieved a widely admired balance of volume and mass in the flowing black hair through a technique of shallow grooves cut into the woodblock more typically associated with the rival sōsaku-hanga movement, illustrating how porous the boundary between the two schools actually was. Sketches surviving from the period suggest an intimate familiarity with the model, giving the print a subjective quality of gaze rarely found elsewhere in ukiyo-e or shin-hanga portraiture.

Surviving preparatory sketches also make it possible to identify Goyō's favourite model: a young woman named Kodaira Tomi, who worked as a maid in Osaka, who had already appeared in Yokugo ratai onna, and who recurs in most of his prints of women from 1918 to 1921, a degree of documentation almost unique in the history of Japanese printmaking.

=== Gallery ===
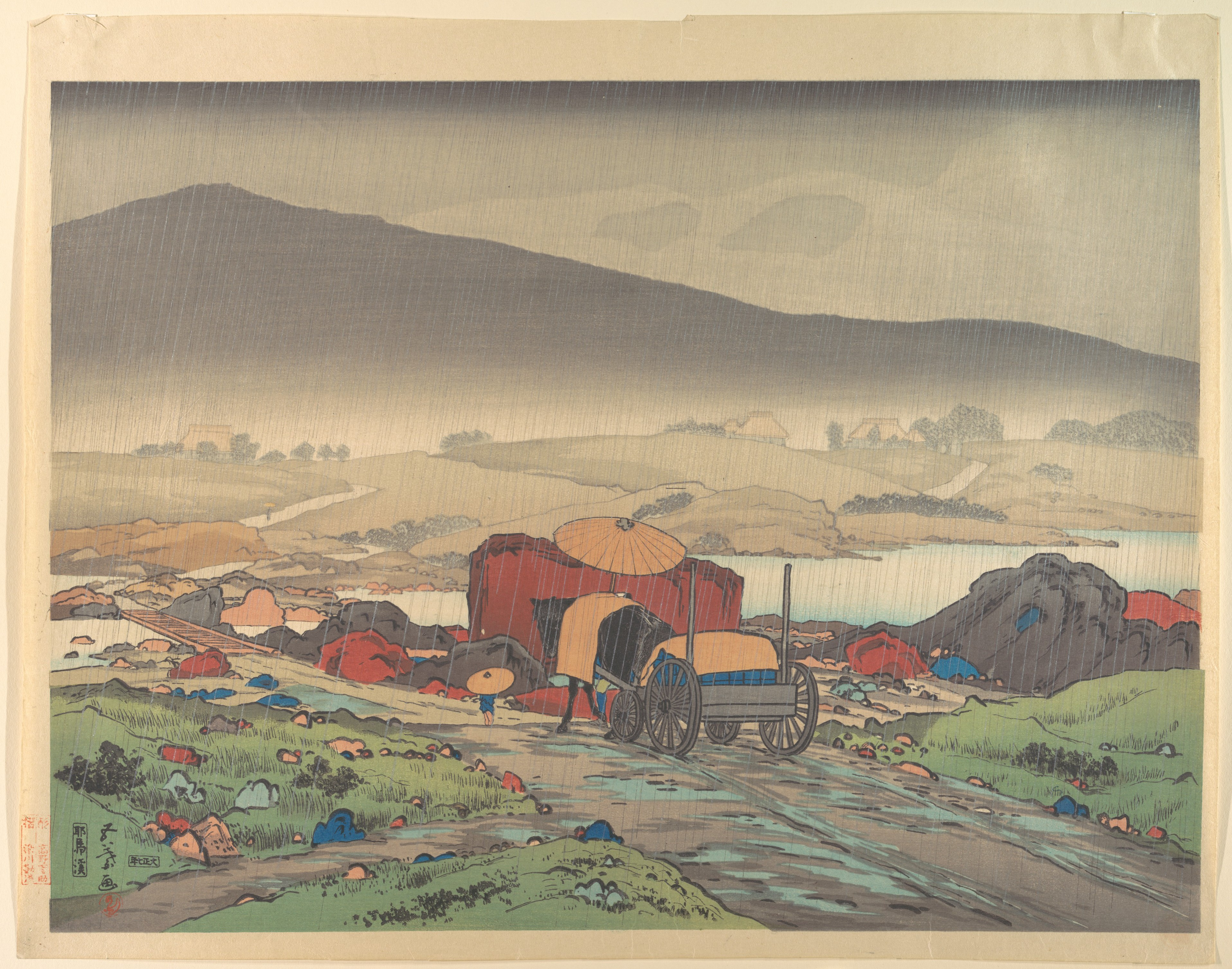
Rain at Yabakei (1918)

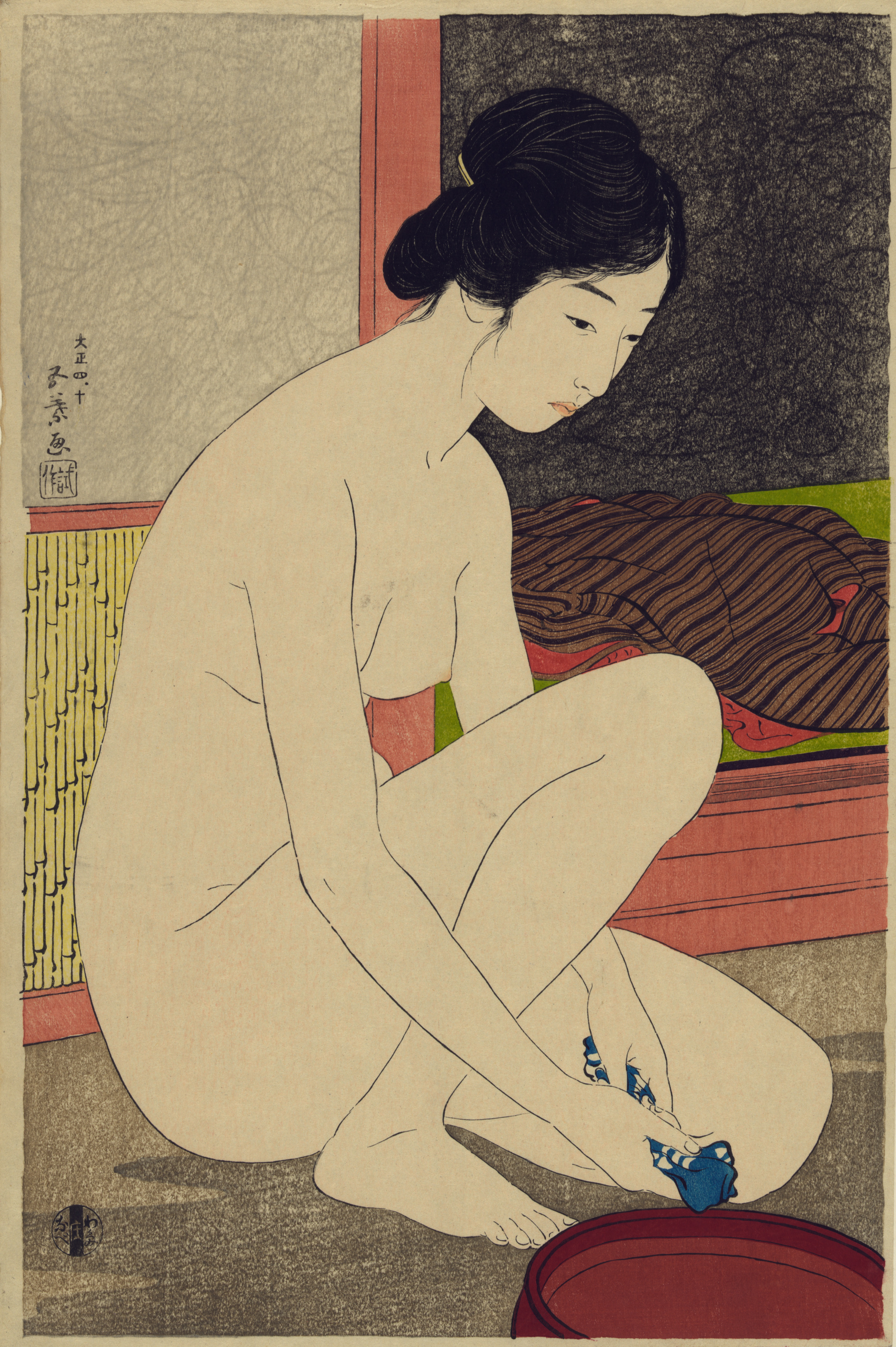
Woman at Her Bath, 1915; the first shin-hanga

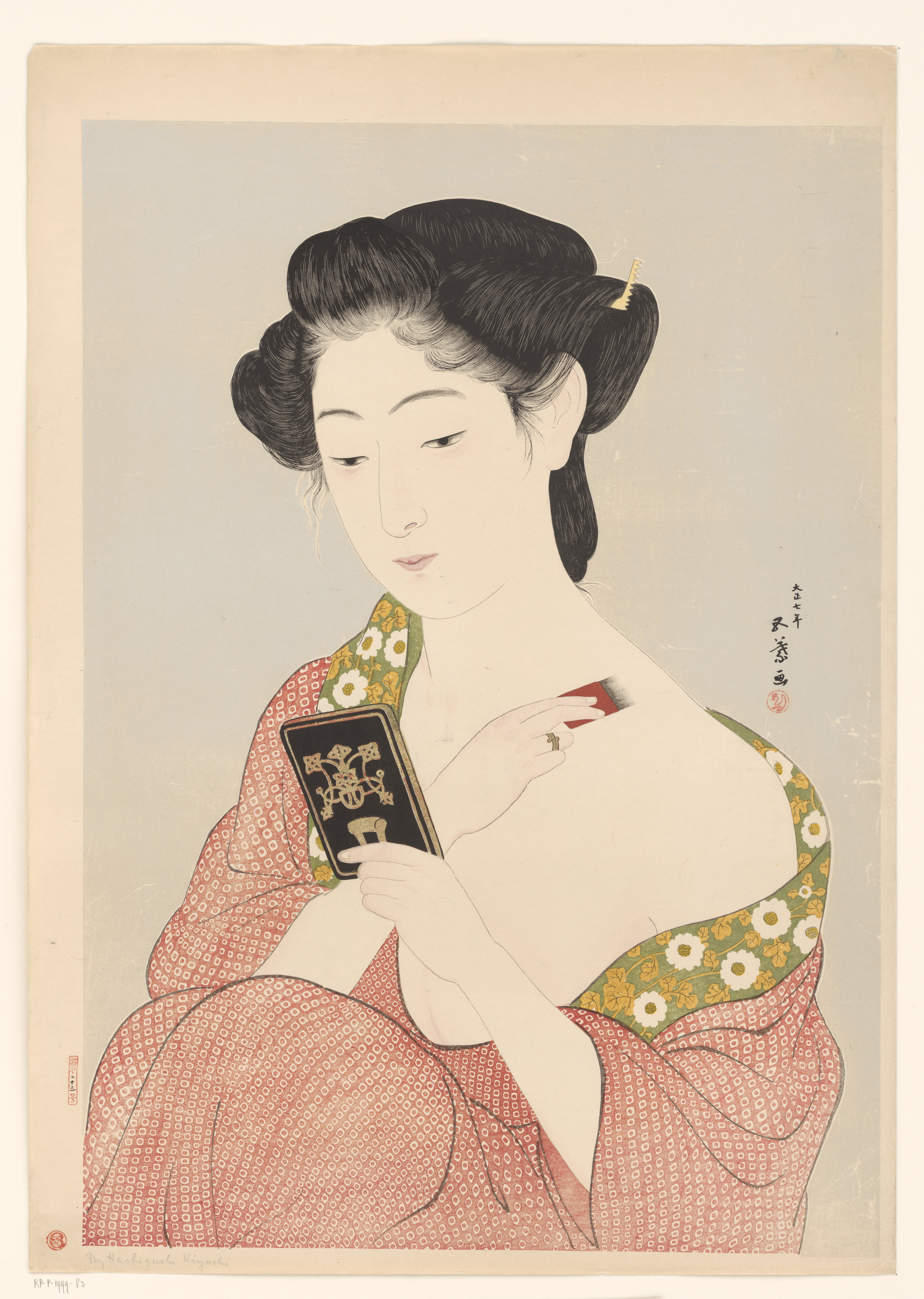
Woman Applying Powder, 1918

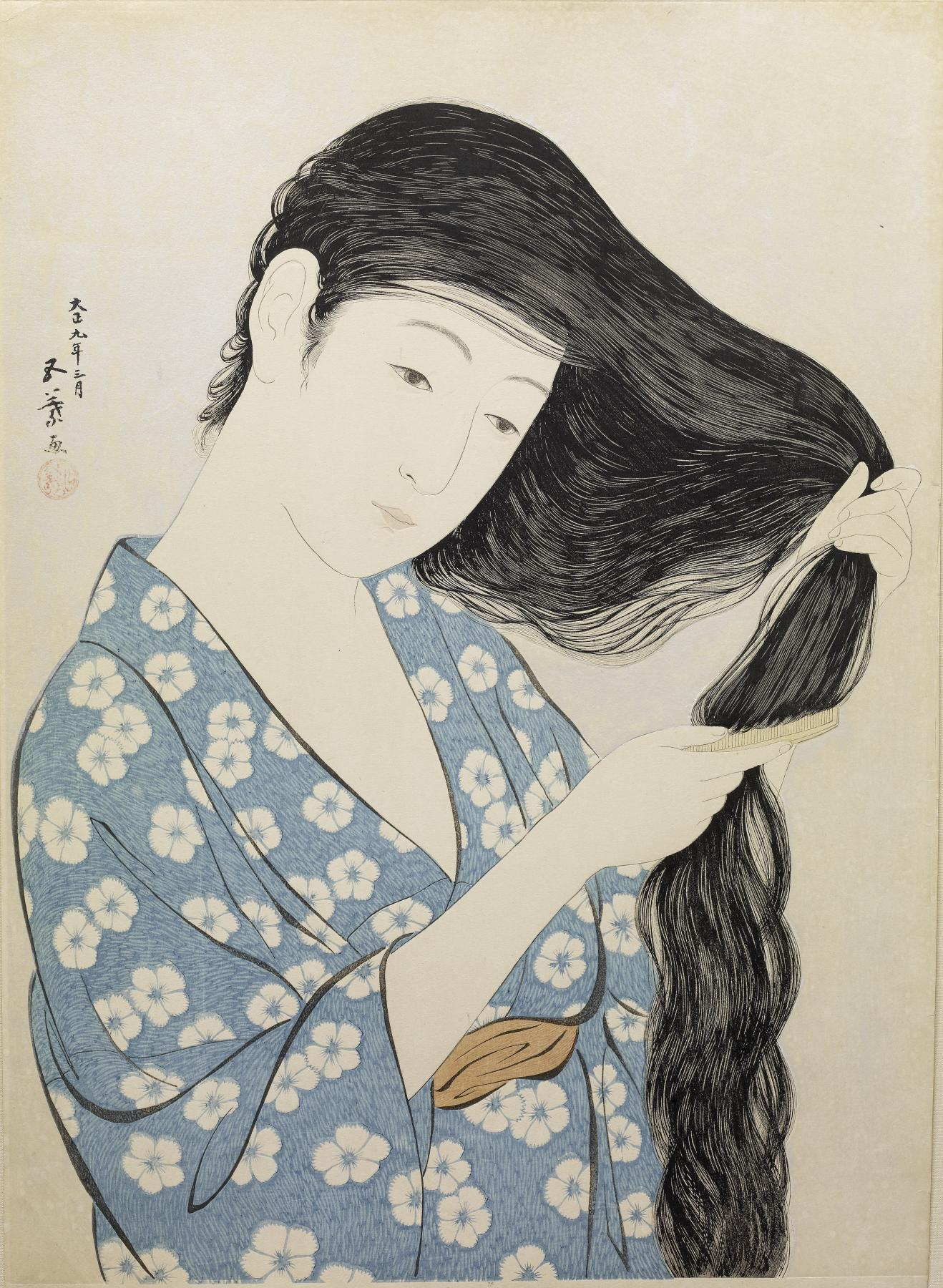
Woman Combing Hair, 1920

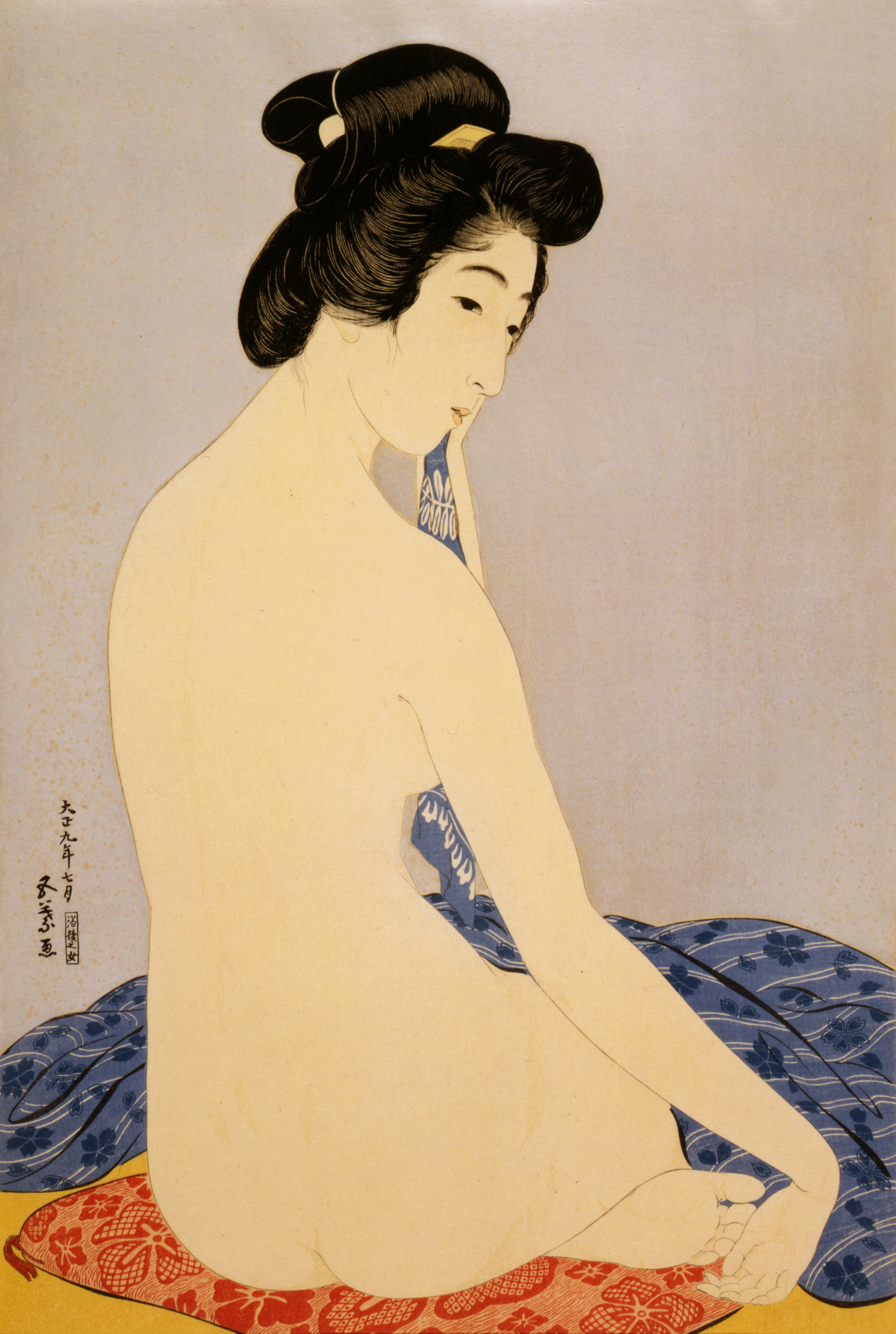
Woman After Bath, 1920

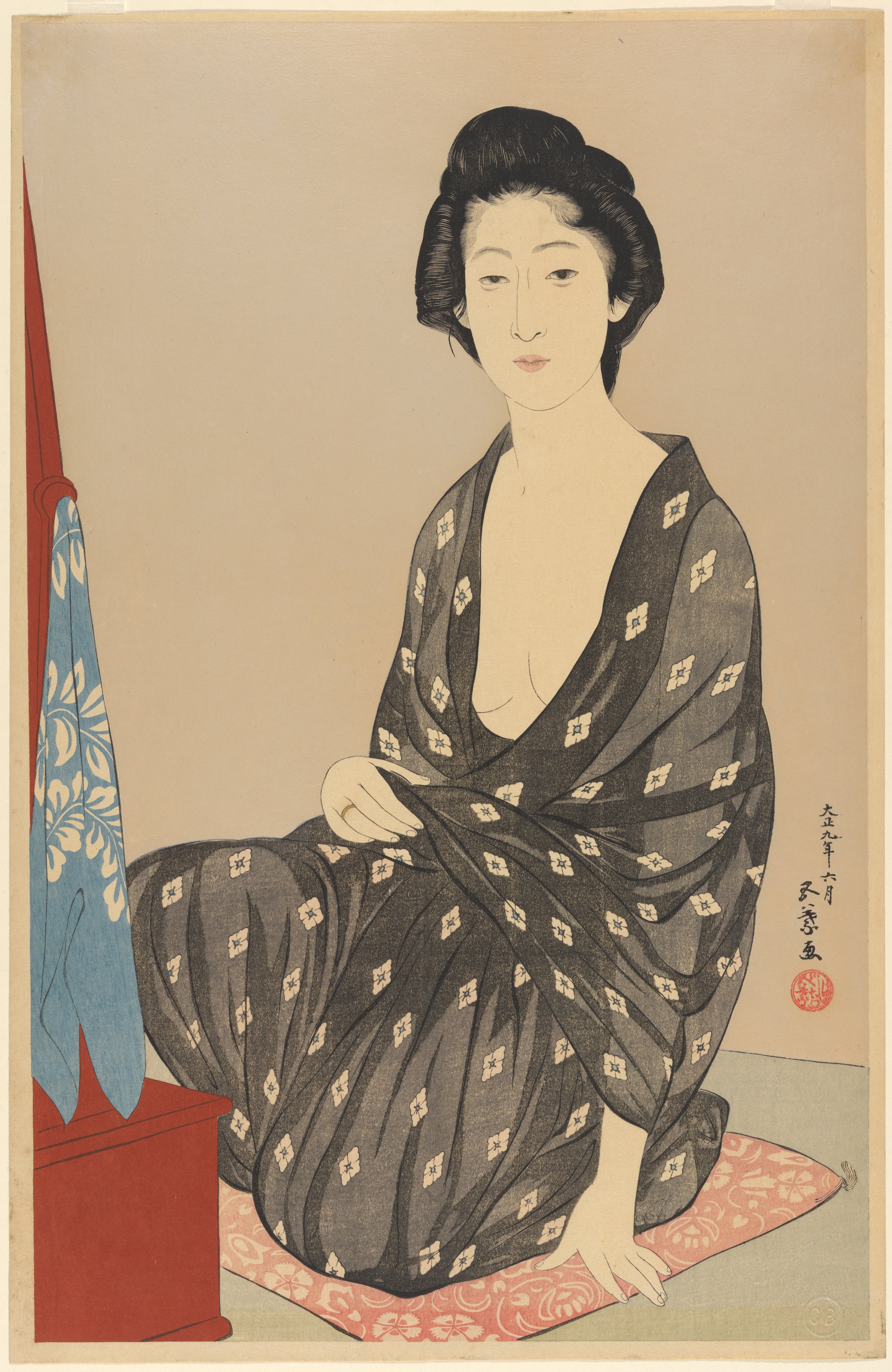
A Woman in Summer Robe (1920)

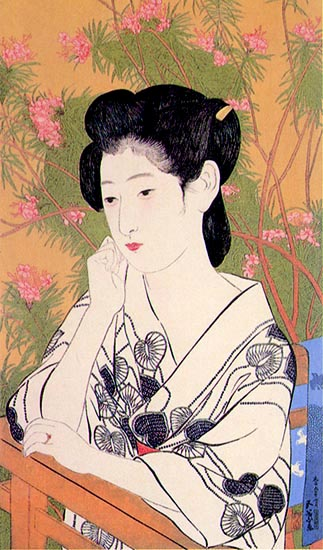
Hot Spring Hotel, 1921; supervised by Hashiguchi from his deathbed

== Death ==
In late 1920, Hashiguchi's latent health problems escalated into meningitis. He supervised his last print Hot Spring Hotel from his deathbed, but could not finish it personally. He died in February 1921 at the age of 41.

Goyō left several sketches from which his elder brother and nephew produced seven more prints. The carving and printing had been commissioned to Maeda Kentarō and Hirai Koichi.

Goyō Hashiguchi prints are of extremely high quality and sold well despite their high prices upon publication. Apart from his first print published with Watanabe, his prints were produced during a span of only two years.

The blocks for the fourteen prints and many of the prints themselves were destroyed in the Great Kantō earthquake of 1923. However, Goyō reprints are currently on the market. Most reprints are marked with a small seal in the side margin, something which does not appear on original prints. Many years after Goyō's death, his brother used Goyō's remaining designs as the basis for ten more prints. These were published with the same standards as the earlier prints and in limited numbers. The printing was supervised by Goyō's nephew, Hashiguchi Yasuo. Today, works by Goyō are among the most highly prized of all shin-hanga prints.

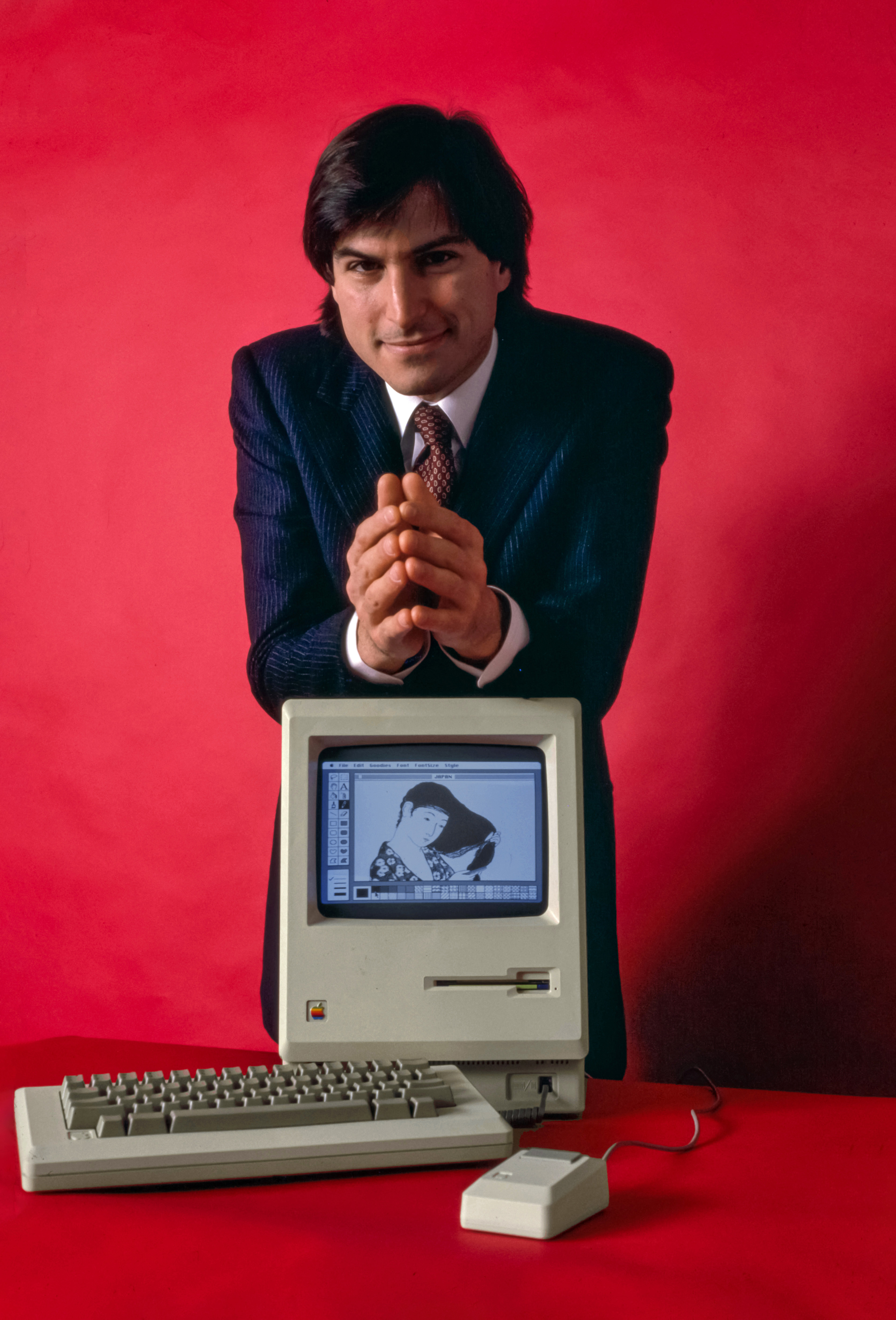
The print 髪梳ける女 was introduced to a wide audience via the Macintosh's MacPaint in 1984

== Further readings ==
- Merritt, Helen and Nanako Yamada. (1995). Guide to Modern Japanese Woodblock Prints, 1900-1975. Honolulu: University of Hawaii Press. ISBN 9780824817329; ISBN 9780824812867; OCLC 247995392
- Helen Merritt, "Modern Japanese Woodblock Prints - The early years", published by University of Hawaii Press, Honolulu, 1990, ISBN 0-8248-1200-X.
