= Kamisaka Sekka =

Japanese artist

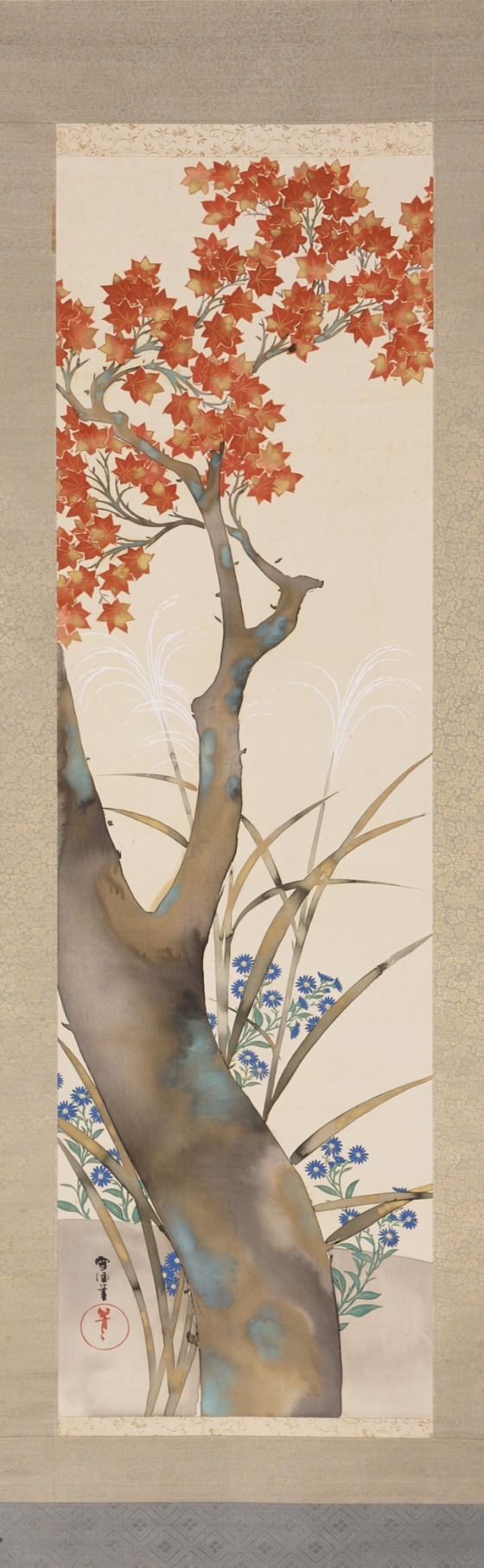

Kamisaka Sekka (神坂 雪佳; 1866–1942) was an important artistic figure in early twentieth-century Japan. Born in Kyoto to a samurai family, his talents for art and design were recognized early. He eventually allied himself with the traditional Rinpa school of art. He is considered the last great proponent of this artistic tradition. Sekka also worked in lacquer and in a variety of other media.

== Work ==
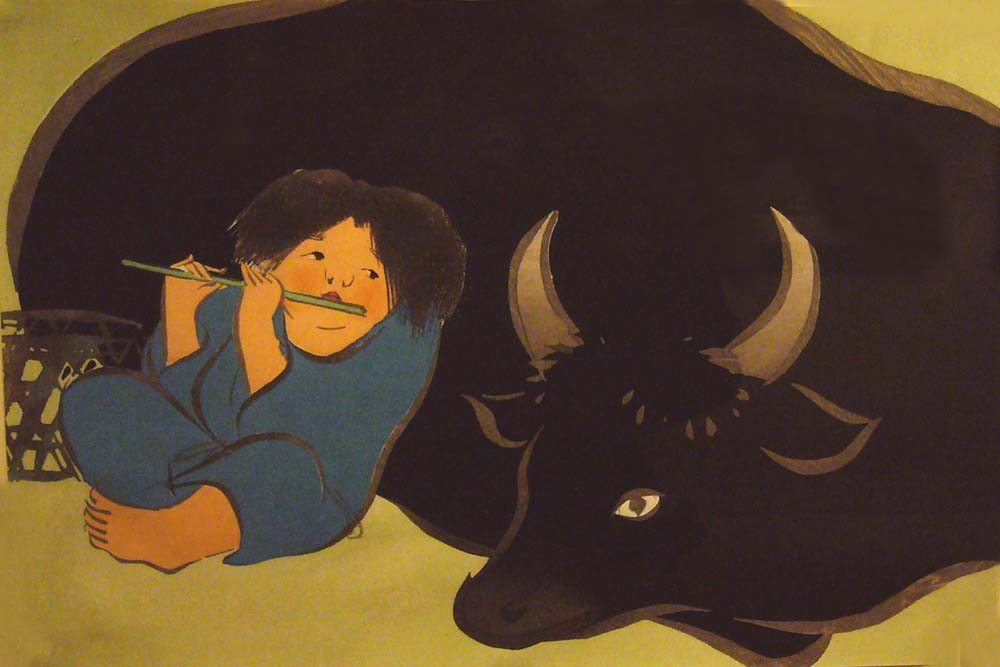
From the series A World of Things, 1909–1910

As traditional Japanese styles became unfashionable (such as Rinpa style), Japan implemented policies to promote the country's unique artistic style by upgrading the status of traditional artists who infused their craft with a dose of modernism. In 1901, Sekka was sent by the Japanese government to Glasgow where he was heavily influenced by Art Nouveau. He sought to learn more about the Western attraction to Japonism, and which elements or facets of Japanese art would be more attractive to the West. Returning to Japan, he taught at the newly opened Kyoto Municipal School of Arts and Crafts, experimented with Western tastes, styles, and methods, and incorporated them into his otherwise traditional Japanese-style works.

=== Momoyogusa ===
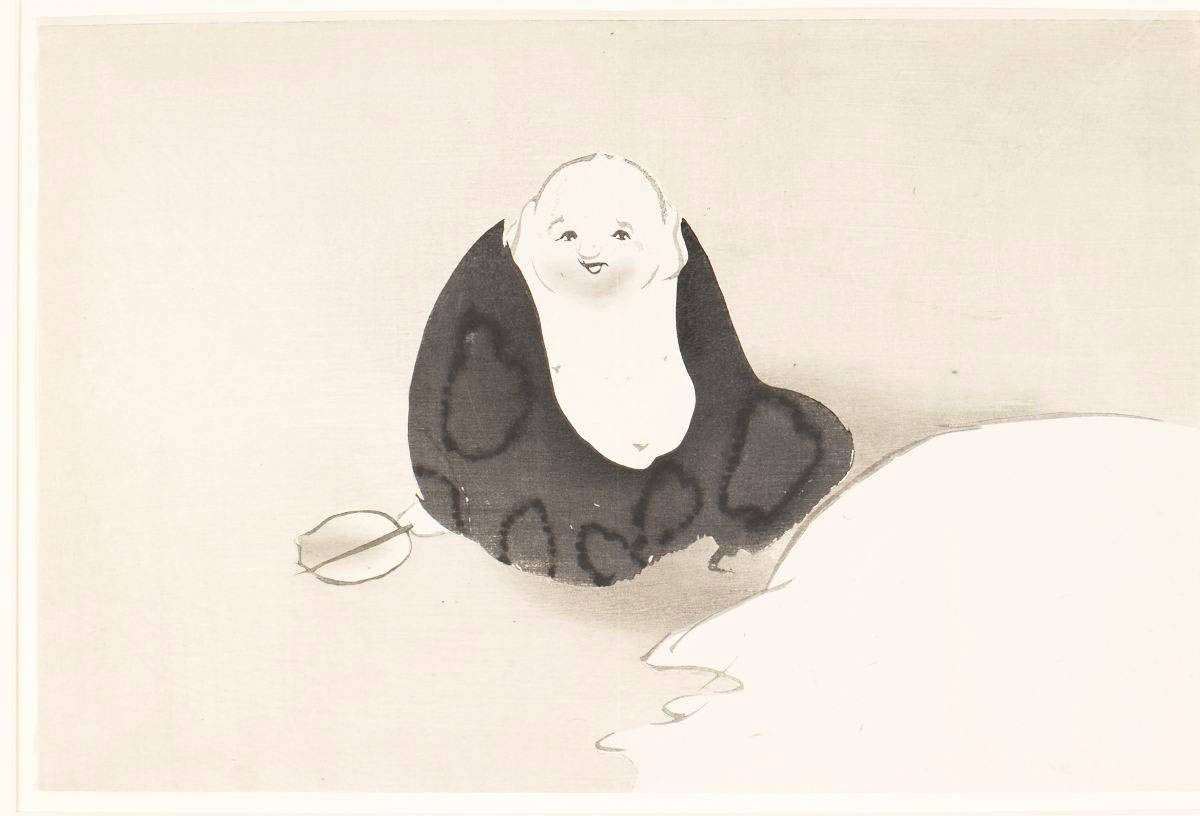
A woodblock print from Kamisaka Sekka's series A World of Things

Momoyogusa (A World of Things) is considered Sekka's woodblock-print masterpiece. The three-volume set was commissioned between 1909 and 1910 by the publishing firm Unsodo of Kyoto. The Japanese name of the series can first be found in the eighth-century poetic text Collection of Ten Thousand Leaves (Man'yōshū), which refers to a multi-leaved autumnal herb (momoyogusa), possibly a chrysanthemum or wormwood. The sixty image work displays a variety of landscapes, figures, classical themes, and innovative subjects, captured in a small space. They showcase Sekka's mastery of traditional Rimpa style and his understanding of the innovations influencing Japan at the time.

== See also ==
- The pamphlet of the exhibition of Kamisaka(2007.9.22)(pdf)
