= List of painters by name beginning with "O" =

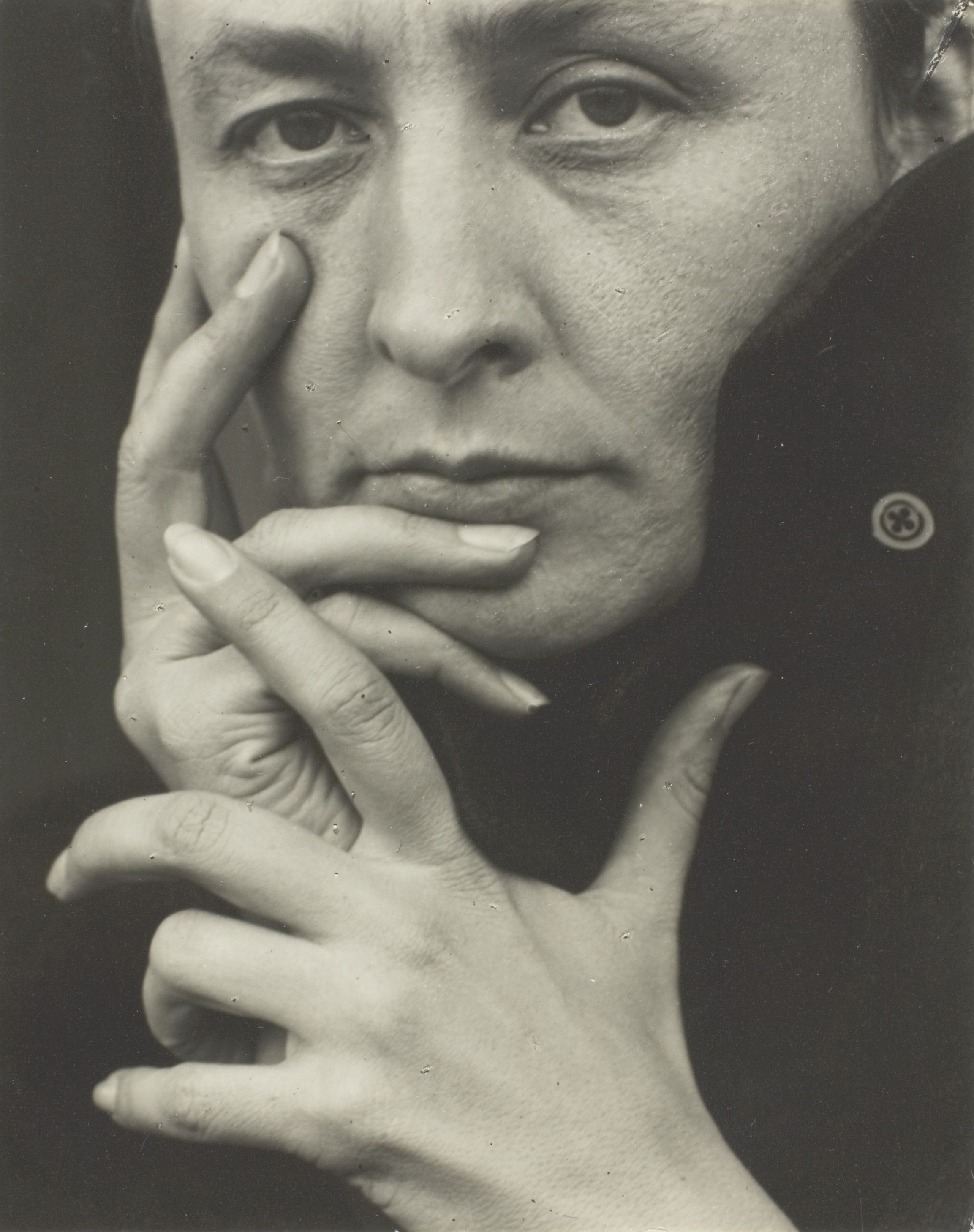
Georgia O'Keeffe

Please add names of notable painters with a Wikipedia page, in precise English alphabetical order, using U.S. spelling conventions. Country and regional names refer to where painters worked for long periods, not to personal allegiances.

- Alejandro Obregón (1920–1992), Colombian painter, sculptor and engraver
- Bencho Obreshkov (1899–1970), Bulgarian painter
- Jacques-François Ochard (1800–1870), French artist and teacher
- Jacob Ochtervelt (1634–1682), Dutch painter
- Leonard Ochtman (1854–1935), American painter
- Ogata Gekkō (尾形月耕, 1859–1920), Japanese painter and ukiyo-e woodblock print-maker
- Ogata Kenzan (尾形乾山, 1663–1743), Japanese potter and painter
- Ogata Kōrin (尾形光琳, 1658–1716), Japanese painter, lacquerer and designer
- Juan O'Gorman (1905–1982), Mexican painter and architect
- Yuki Ogura (1895–2000), Japanese nihonga painter
- Dorothea Warren O'Hara (1873–1972), American ceramicist
- Ohara Koson (小原古邨, 1877–1945), Japanese painter and print designer
- Doug Ohlson (1936–2010), American artist
- Michalis Oikonomou (1888–1933), Greek painter
- Okada Beisanjin (岡田米山人, 1744–1820), Japanese painter and rice merchant
- Okada Hanko (1782–1846)
- Okamoto Tarō (1911–1996)
- Georgia O'Keeffe (1887–1986), American artist
- Aloysius O'Kelly (1853–1941)
- Okuda Gensō (1912–2003)
- Okumura Masanobu (1686–1764)
- Okumura Togyu (1889–1990)
- Jules Olitski (1922–2007), American abstract painter, printmaker, and sculptor
- Viktor Oliva (1861–1928), Austro-Hungarian (Czech)/Czechoslovak painter and illustrator
- Nathan Oliveira (1928–2010), American painter, printmaker, and sculptor
- Ceferí Olivé (1907–1995), Catalan watercolor painter
- Madge Oliver (1875–1924), English/French painter
- Francisco Oller (1833–1917), Puerto Rican visual artist
- Geoffrey Olsen (1943–2007), Welsh/American artist
- Frank O'Meara (1853–1888), Irish painter
- Kōshirō Onchi (恩地孝四郎, 1891–1955), Japanese print-maker
- Julian Onderdonk (1882–1922), American painter
- Tadashige Ono (小野忠重, 1909–1990), Japanese woodblock artist
- Maria van Oosterwijk (1630–1693), Dutch painter
- Bruce Onobrakpeya (born 1932), Nigerian print-maker, painter and sculptor
- John Opie (1761–1807), English painter
- Andrea Orcagna (1320–1368), Italian painter, sculptor and architect
- William Quiller Orchardson (1835–1910), Scottish painter
- Edward Otho Cresap Ord, II (1858–1923), American painter and poet
- Bryan Organ (born 1935), English painter
- Emil Orlik (1870–1932), Austrian painter, etcher and lithographer
- Aleksander Orłowski (1777–1832), Polish painter, sketch maker and lithographer
- István Orosz (born 1951), Hungarian painter, print-maker and animated film director
- José Clemente Orozco (1883–1949), Mexican painter
- Sir William Orpen (1878–1931), Irish painter
- Manuel Ortíz de Zarate (1887–1946), Chilean painter
- George Earl Ortman (1926–2015), American painter, print-maker and sculptor
- Erik Ortvad (1917–2008), Danish painter
- Walter Osborne (1859–1903), Irish painter
- Adriaen van Ostade (1610–1685), Dutch painter
- Isaac van Ostade (1621–1649), Dutch painter
- Ilya Ostroukhov (1858–1929), Russian painter and art collector
- Masamitsu Ōta (太田雅光, 1892–1975), Japanese print-maker
- Otake Chikuha (尾竹竹坡, 1878–1936), Japanese painter
- Johann Friedrich Overbeck (1789–1869), German painter
- Amédée Ozenfant (1886–1966), French painter and writer
- Auseklis Ozols (born 1941), American painter and teacher
