= Paul Binnie =

Scottish artist in Japanese woodblock printing

- Binnie in 2017
- Born: Paul James Binnie; 27 May 1967 (age 58); Airthrey Castle, Scotland
- Education: University of Edinburgh; Edinburgh College of Art
- Known for: Japanese woodblock printing, oil painting, figure drawing

Paul Binnie (born 27 May 1967) is a Scottish artist working in the Japanese tradition of woodblock printing. His work is reflective of the shin-hanga artists of the early to mid-20th century, employing subjects such as landscapes, tattoos, and bijin.

== Biography ==
Binnie was born in Airthrey Castle, Scotland on 27 May 1967 and studied art history at the University of Edinburgh and painting and etching at Edinburgh College of Art from 1985 to 1990. After taking his Master's degree (honours) in 1990 he moved to Paris until his interest in Japanese ukiyo-e prints took him to Japan in 1993. There he studied woodblock printmaking as an apprentice to Seki Kenji, master printer of Doi publisher.

While in Japan, Binnie began experimenting with kappazuri (stencil printing). His first stencil prints were depictions of tattooed figures, followed by yakusha-e (kabuki actor prints). By late 1995, Binnie had left Seki’s studio to concentrate on his own work, primarily focusing on actor prints, a genre which he had begun to collect. His interest increased in actor prints by shin-hanga artists such as Natori Shunsen and Masamitsu Ota, and he also began to collect fukeiga (landscape prints) by artists such as Hasui Kawase and Hiroshi Yoshida.

Cho Musubi (Butterfly Bow), 2005, woodblock print, incorporated an historical reference to Red and White Plum Blossoms by Ogata Kōrin

In 1998, Binnie moved to London and set up his own studio, where he expanded his subjects to include cloud studies, landscapes, and bijin (beautiful women). While his actor prints were largely concerned with capturing an actor's expression in a given moment, his landscape and bijin prints often incorporated an historical reference, usually to well-known Japanese prints or paintings. His Shiki (Four Seasons) series, for example, referenced prints of shin-hanga artists such as Goyō Hashiguchi and Shinsui Itō.

Hokusai no Taki (Hokusai's Waterfalls), 2006, woodblock print. The depicted tattoos were based on prints from A Tour of the Waterfalls of the Provinces by Hokusai

In 2004, Binnie returned to depicting tattooed figures, both male and female, in the series, A Hundred Shades of Ink of Edo in which he applied designs from ukiyo-e artists such as Hokusai and Hiroshige to nude figures. Each of the ten prints in the series was based on the work of an individual ukiyo-e artist. Soon after completion of the tenth print in 2015, the Metropolitan Museum of Art in New York purchased the complete series for its collection.

Binnie continues his work on bijin-ga with the series Flowers of A Hundred Years, which began in 2012. The series of ten prints explores the "changing roles, political and social situations and lifestyles of women in Japan in the 20th century, decade by decade."

== Collections ==
Significant print collections featuring Binnie's work:

- Metropolitan Museum of Art
- Brooklyn Museum
- Minneapolis Institute of Art
- Toledo Museum of Art
- Rijksmuseum Rijksprentenkabinet
- Nihon no Hanga Museum, Amsterdam
- The British Museum Griffith Bequest
- Edinburgh College of Art
