= Ito Yuhan =

Japanese artist

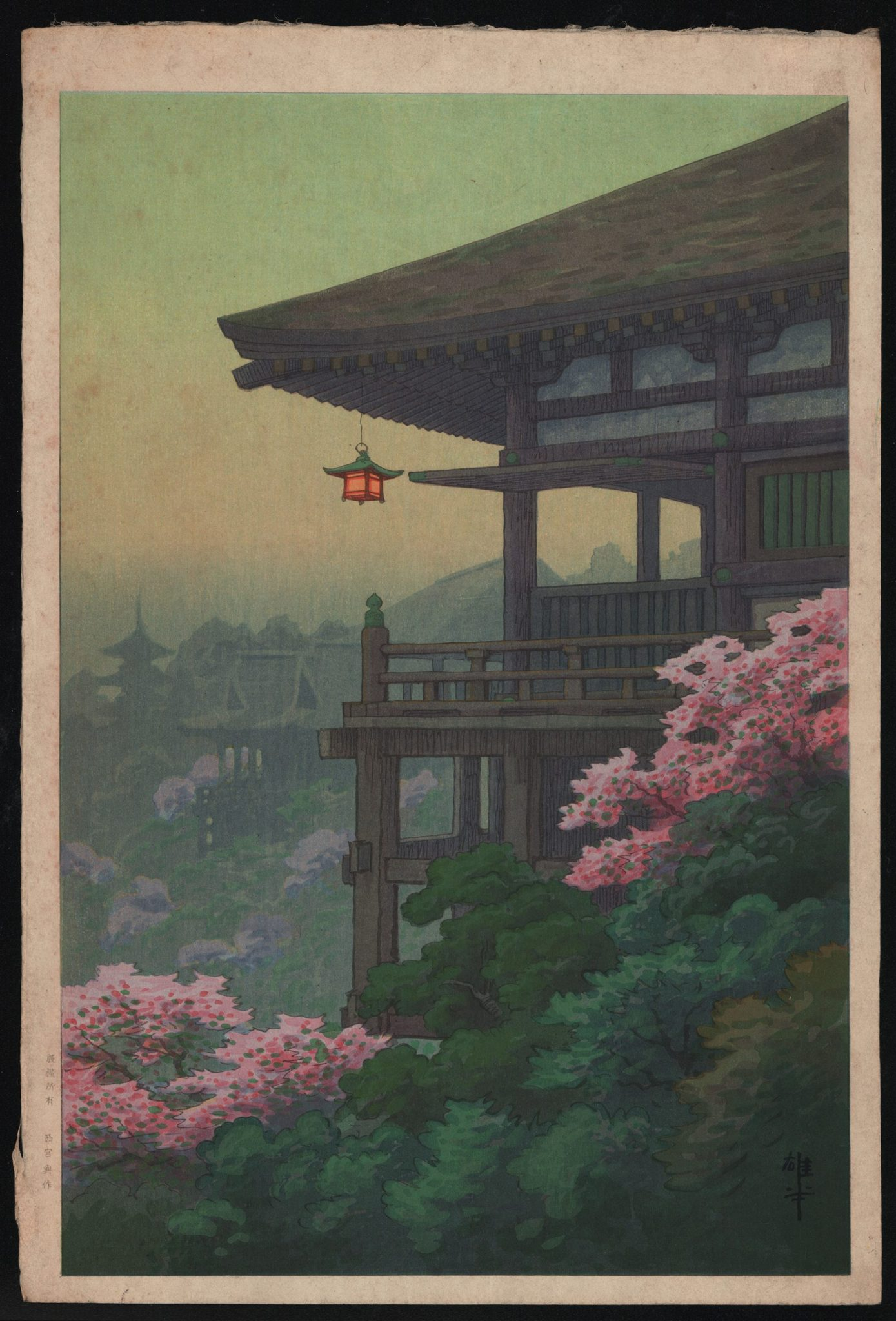
Kiyomizu-dera-Tempel by Ito Yuhan (circa 1930)

Ito Yuhan (伊藤 雄半, 1882-1951) was a Japanese landscape artist who made woodblock prints.

He studied at the Kyoto Prefecture School of Painting and at Harada Naojirō's Shobikan art school in Tokyo.

He was associated with the later Shin-hanga movement and a series of prints was created in the 1950s by the publisher Yosaku Nishinomiya. Earlier print impressions demonstrated clear key block outlines typical other shin-hanga artists. Later print impressions lacked these clear outlines and had similar soft tones to a watercolor.
