= Shin-hanga =

Japanese art movement

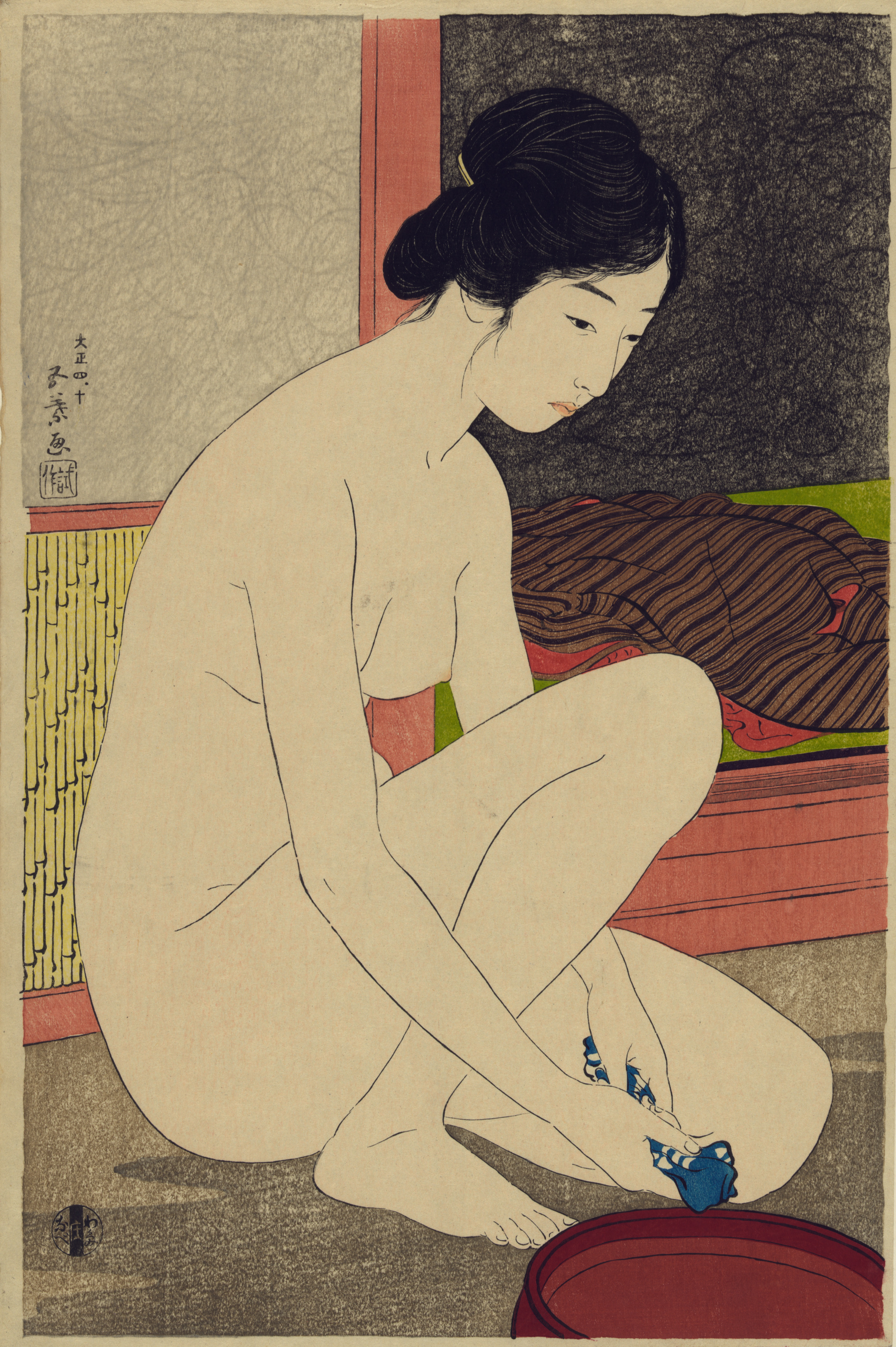
Yokugo no onna (Woman at Her Bath), by Hashiguchi Goyō (published Feb. 1916). One of the first shin-hanga published by Watanabe Shozaburo.

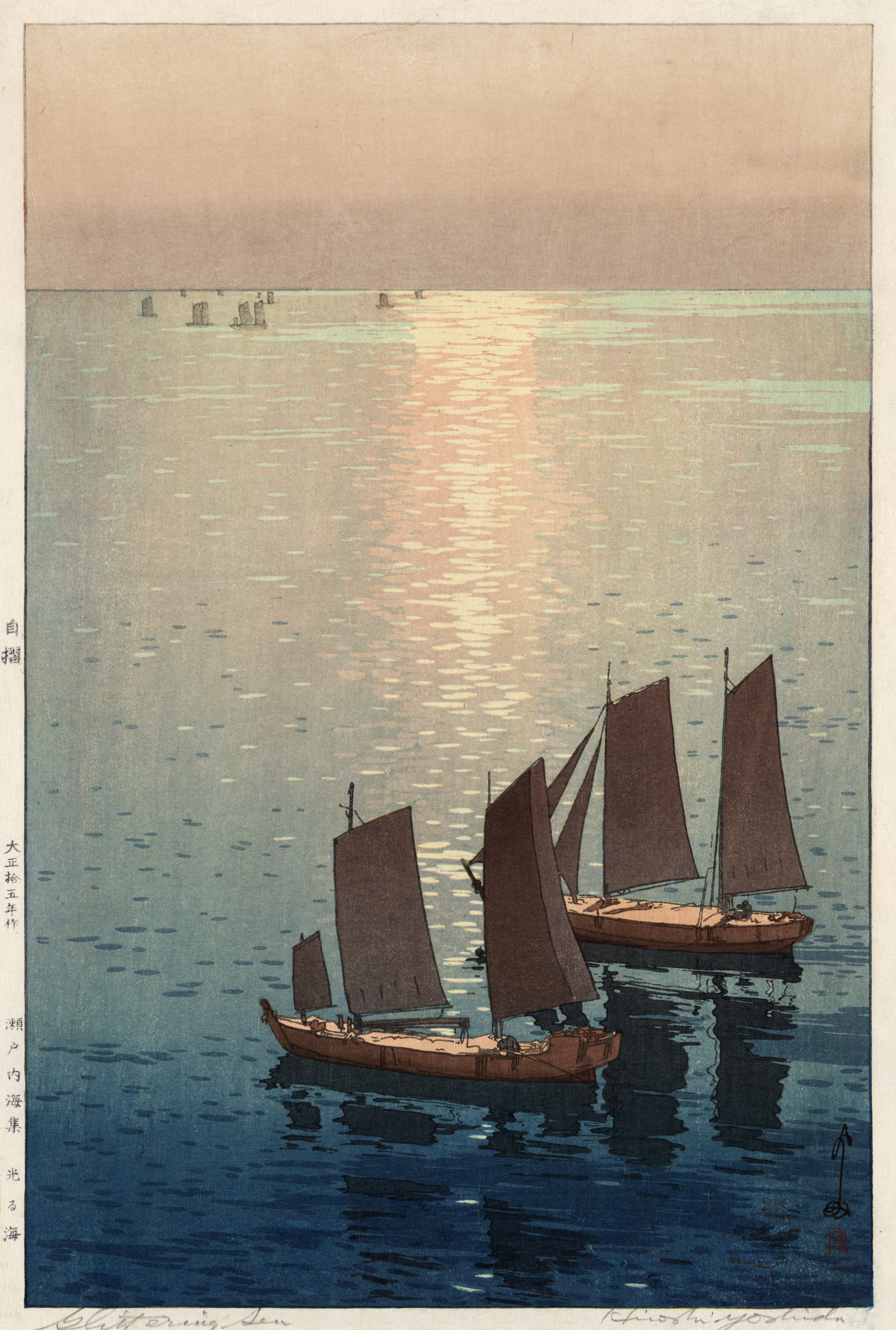
Hikari umi (Glittering Sea), by Hiroshi Yoshida (1926)

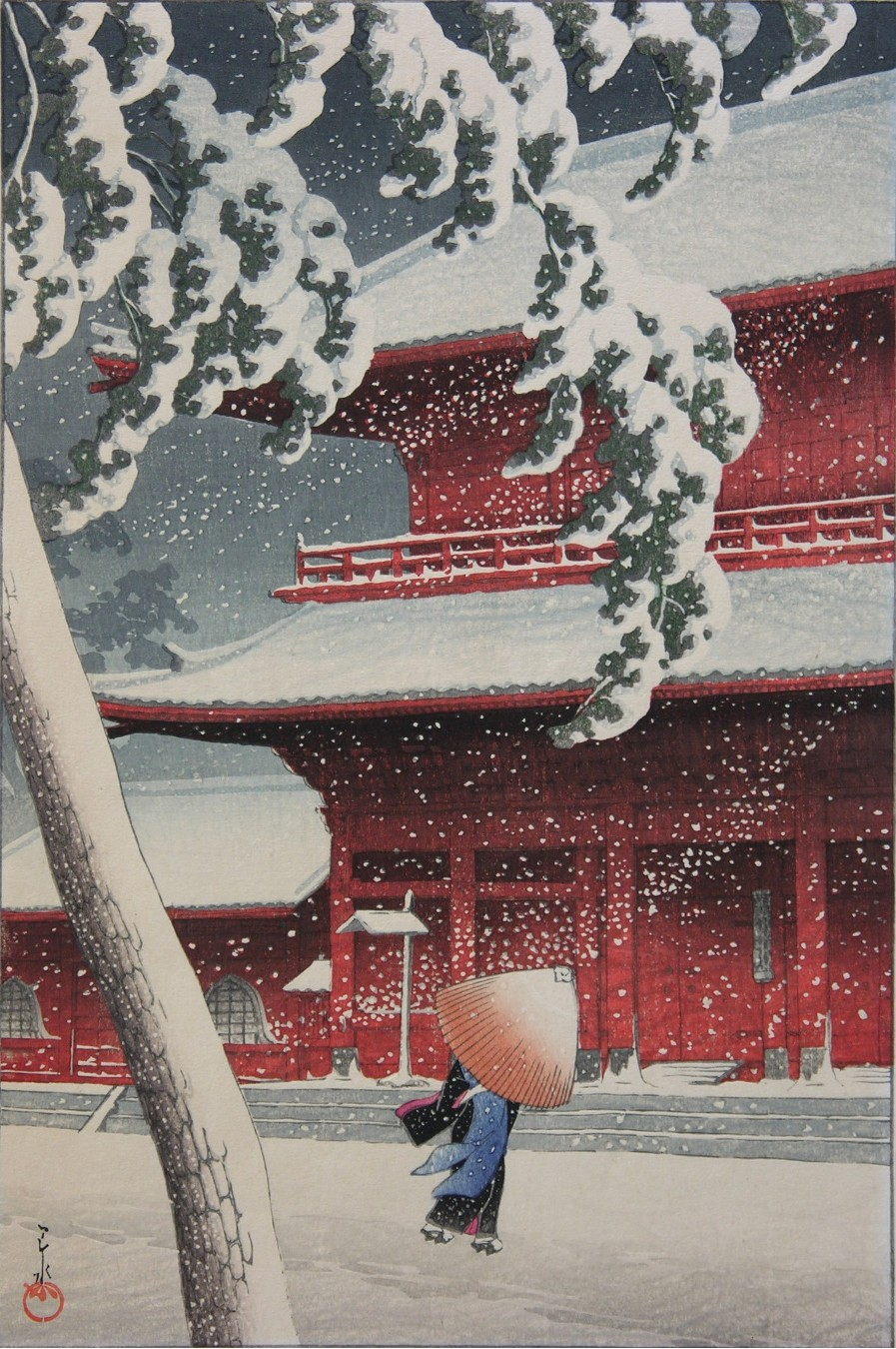
Shiba Zōjōji, by Kawase Hasui (1925)

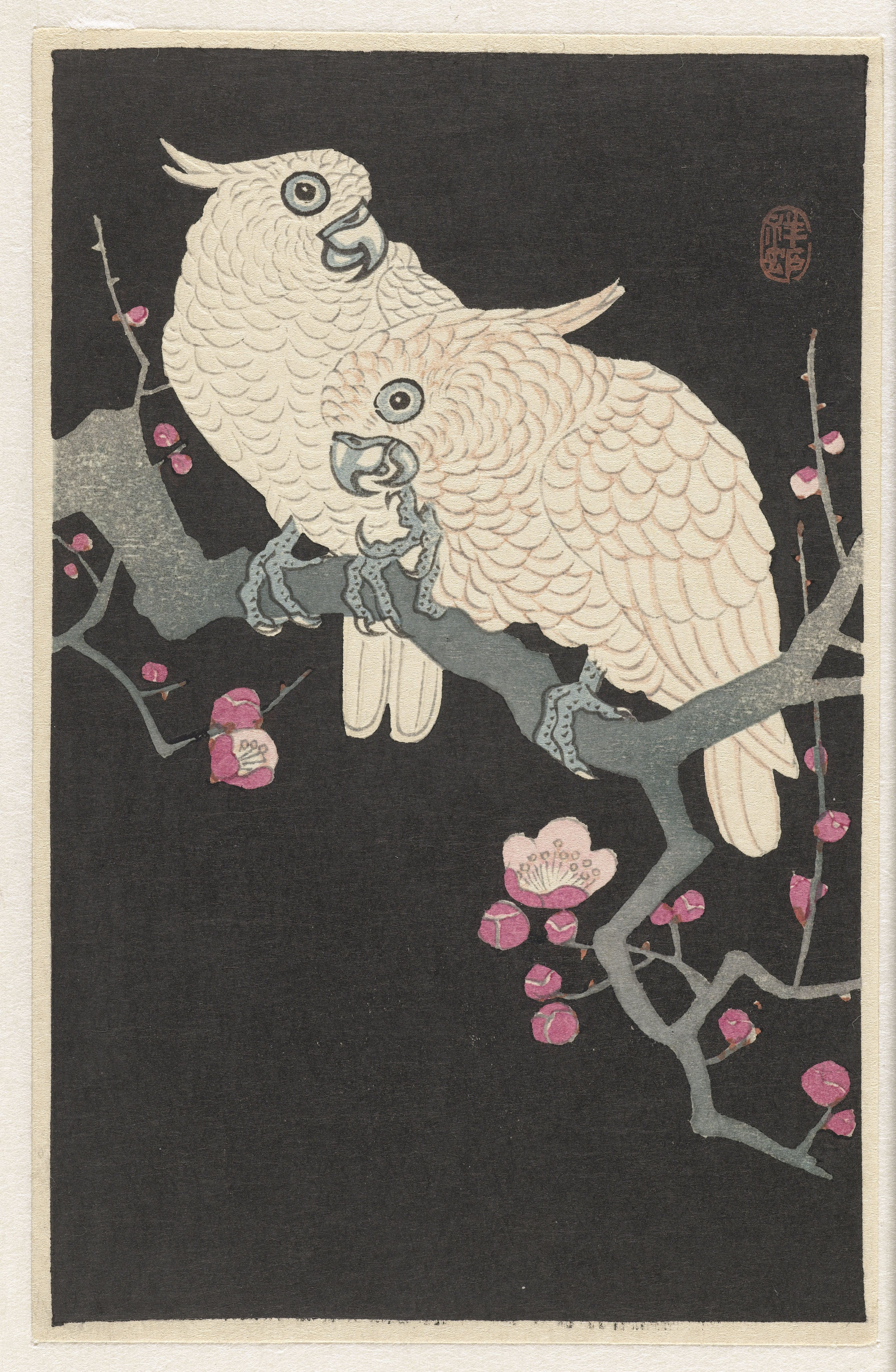
Two Cockatoos on Plum Blossom Tree, by Ohara Koson (c. 1925–1935)

Shin-hanga (新版画; lit. "new prints", "new woodcut (block) prints") was an art movement in early 20th-century Japan, during the Taishō and Shōwa periods, that revitalized the traditional ukiyo-e art rooted in the Edo and Meiji periods (17th–19th century). It maintained the traditional ukiyo-e collaborative system (hanmoto system) where the artist, carver, printer, and publisher engaged in division of labor, as opposed to the parallel sōsaku-hanga (creative prints) movement.

The movement was initiated and nurtured by publisher Watanabe Shozaburo (1885–1962), and flourished from around 1915 to 1942, resuming on a smaller scale after the Second World War through the 1950s and 1960s. Watanabe approached European artists residing in Tokyo, Friedrich Capelari and Charles W. Bartlett to produce woodblock prints inspired by European Impressionism.

Shin-hanga artists incorporated Western elements such as the impression of light and the expression of individual moods. It eschewed ukiyo-e traditions of emulating hand-drawn brushstrokes seeking instead to "create works replete with creativity and rich with artistic quality, by avoiding enslavement to hand-drawn painting or old models".

Watanabe introduced new printing techniques, most notably in the extensive use of printed layers of either baren suji-zuri (printed marks left deliberately by the baren) or goma-zuri (printed speckles), printed on thicker and usually less moist paper than past ukiyo-e prints. Watanabe considered shin-hanga to be fine art (geijutsu) and separate from shinsaku-hanga, the term that he used to describe less labor-intensive souvenir prints such as those by Takahashi Shōtei. Shin-hanga themes, however, remained strictly traditional; themes of landscapes (fukeiga), famous places (meishō), beautiful women (bijinga), kabuki actors (yakusha-e), and birds-and-flowers (kachō-e).

== History ==
Popular with Westerners,shin-hanga prints appealed to the Western taste for nostalgic and romanticized views of Japan and as such, enjoyed immense popularity overseas. In the 1920s, there were articles on shin-hanga in the International Studio, The Studio, The Art News and The Art Digest magazines. The first shin-hanga exported were Capelari and Bartlett prints in 1916, however, no foreign exhibitions were held until Boston in March 1924. A larger exhibition of 68 works was held at the Herron Art Institute in October 1926. Later, the promoter of said Boston and Indianapolis touring exhibitions, artist Hiroshi Yoshida, helped organize and promote two very large exhibitions at the Toledo Museum of Art in Ohio in 1930 and 1936. Through the 1930s and then after the Second World War, art dealers such as Robert O. Muller (1911-2003) imported shin-hanga to satisfy Western demand.

There was not much domestic market for shin-hanga prints in Japan. Ukiyo-e prints were considered by the Japanese as mass commercial products, as opposed to the European view of ukiyo-e as fine art during the climax of Japonisme. After decades of modernization and Westernization during the Meiji era, architecture, art and clothing in Japan came to follow Western modes. Japanese art students were trained in the Western tradition. Western oil paintings (yōga) were considered high art and received official recognition from the Bunten (The Ministry of Education Fine Arts Exhibition). Shin-hanga prints, on the other hand, were considered as a variation of the outdated ukiyo-e. They were dismissed by the Bunten and were subordinated under oil paintings and sculptures.

As foreign demand for shin-hanga increased through the 1920s, the complexity of prints decreased. Ground layers of baren-suji and goma were less commonly seen and the overall number of printing impressions decreased. To satisfy foreign collectors, colors became brighter and more saturated. Shin-hanga supplanted shinsaku-hanga in the souvenir market and the latter ceased production.

Shin-hanga declined as the military government tightened its control over the arts and culture during wartime. In 1939, the Army Art Association was established under the patronage of the Army Information Section to promote war art. By 1943, an official commission for war painting was set up and artists’ materials were rationed. Overseas market for Japanese prints declined drastically at the same time.

Demand for shin-hanga never regained its momentum postwar. Nevertheless a small number of artists continued in the tradition. Artists such as Itō Shinsui (1898–1972) and Shimura Tatsumi (1907–1980) continued to utilize the collaborative system during the 1960s and 1970s. In the last decades of the 20th century publishers instead concentrated on making reproductions of early 20th century shin-hanga; meanwhile sōsaku-hanga enjoyed immense popularity and prestige in the international art scene. The early 21st century has seen somewhat of a resurgence in shin-hanga popularity notably in market demand for earlier masters such as Kawase Hasui (1883–1957) and Hiroshi Yoshida (1876–1950), and for new artists continuing the shin-hanga aesthetic such as Paul Binnie (1967–).

Steve Jobs, the head of Apple, was among the prominent collectors of shin-hanga.

== Shinsaku Hanga vs. Shin-hanga ==
Shinsaku-hanga (新作版画; lit. "newly-made prints", "newly made, not ukiyo-e reproductions") and shin-hanga have often been conflated. Shinsaku-hanga was the forerunner to shin-hanga and similarly created by the publisher Watanabe Shozaburo. It began in 1907 with the prints of Takahashi Shōtei and prospered until about 1927, with its popularity waning inversely to the growing popularity of shin-hanga. It had ceased completely by 1935.

Shinsaku-hanga was essentially modernization of ukiyo-e and especially the prints of Hiroshige. Compared to shin-hanga, it did not depict contemporary Japan, instead it offered nostalgic views of pre-industrial, pre-Meiji Japan with modern printmaking techniques. Techniques characterized by continuing to replicate the hand-drawn brushstrokes of ukiyo-e (shin-hanga expressly resisted replicating brushstrokes) while beginning to eschew contour lines and large flat areas of color typical of historical ukiyo-e.

This style was very popular early on with tourists in Japan (Watanabe described them as "souvenir prints") and for foreign export. Its typically smaller prints (smaller than shin-hanga) were less expensive to produce and less expensive to purchase, and they ultimately provided the financial stability to Watanabe to nurture the shin-hanga movement.

The best known shinsaku-hanga artists were Takahashi Shōtei, Ohara Koson, Ito Sozan, and Narazaki Eisho. Each of these artists later moved to shin-hanga.

== Notable artists ==
- Arai Yoshimune
- Hashiguchi Goyō
- Hirano Hakuhō
- Itō Shinsui
- Ito Yuhan
- Kaburagi Kiyokata
- Kawase Hasui
- Elizabeth Keith
- Kitano Tsunetomi
- Kobayakawa Kiyoshi
- Natori Shunsen
- Ohara Koson
- Koichi Okada
- Ota Masamitsu (also known as Ota Gako)
- Settai Komura
- Tatsumi Shimura
- Shiro Kasamatsu
- Takahashi Shōtei (also known as Hiroaki)
- Takeji Asano
- Torii Kotondo
- Tsuchiya Koitsu
- Tsuchiya Rakusan
- Yamakawa Shūhō
- Yamamura Toyonari
- Yoshida Hiroshi
