= Takahashi Shōtei =

Japanese woodblock artist (1871–1945)

- 高橋松亭
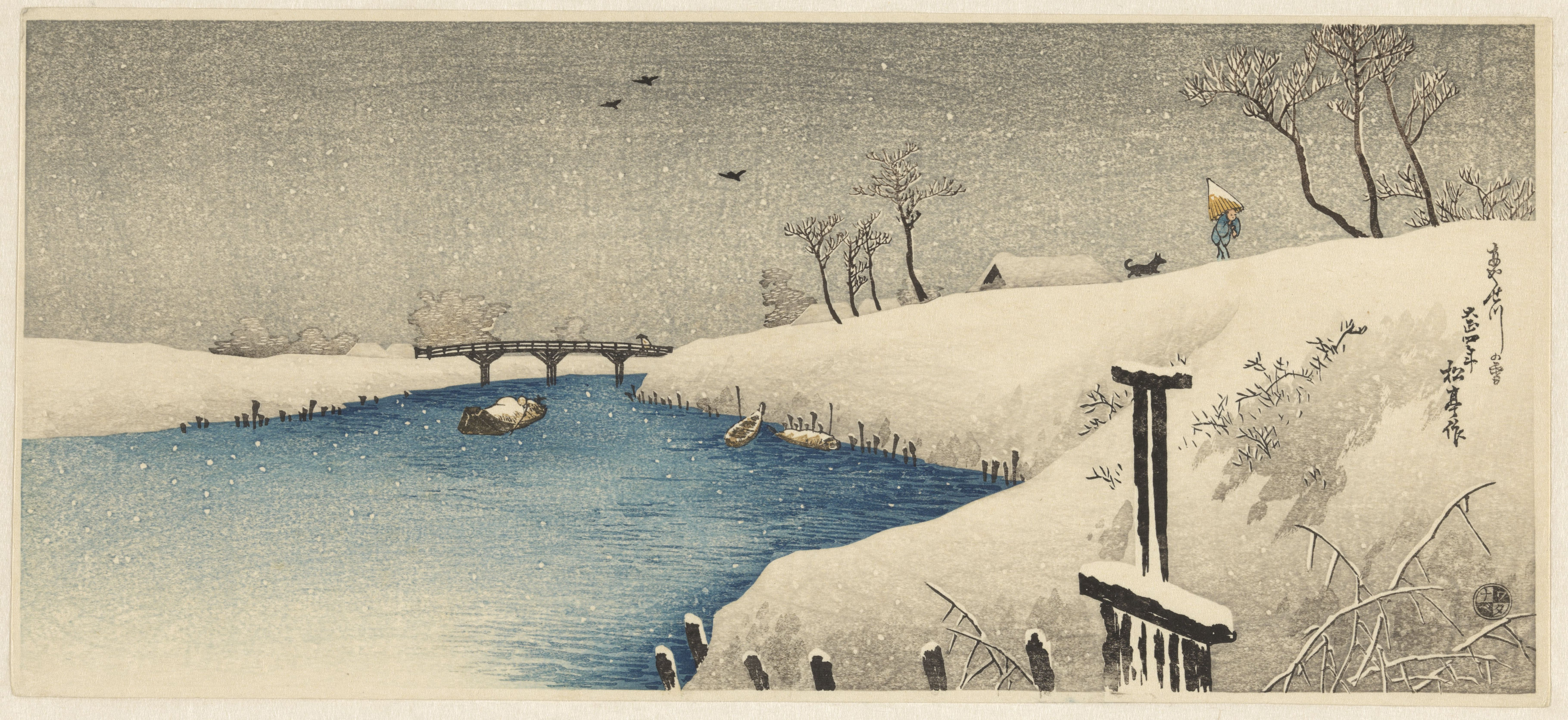
- Snow on Ayase river (1915), now in the collection of the Rijksmuseum
- Born: Hiroaki Takahashi; 1871; Tokyo, Japan
- Died: 11 February 1945 (aged 73–74)
- Known for: woodblock prints; co-founder of the Japan Youth Painting Society

Takahashi Shōtei (高橋松亭), born Matsumoto Katsutarō (1871 – 11 February 1945) was a 20th-century Japanese woodblock artist in the shinsaku-hanga and later shin-hanga art movements.

== Biography ==
Hiroaki Takahashi was born in Tokyo, Japan, in 1871. As a young artist he was given the artistic name Shotei by his uncle, Matsumoto Fuko, under whose tutelage he was apprenticing. He began this apprenticeship at the age of nine. When he was 16 years old, he started a job with the Imperial Household Department of Foreign Affairs, where he copied the designs of foreign ceremonial objects. As with many Japanese woodblock artists over his lifetime he signed his work with various names and worked for several publishing companies. After studying art, Shotei and Terazaki Kogyo founded the Japan Youth Painting Society in 1889. In 1907, as a successful artist, he was recruited by Watanabe Shōzaburō to contribute shinsaku-hanga (souvenir prints) in Japan.

For this first commission, Watanabe asked Shōtei to produce a hanshitae, a preparatory drawing based on Hiroshige's prints, at a time when it was customary to use a finished painting as a print's model instead. The collaboration produced a series of ten landscape prints, which Watanabe exhibited in a friend's shop in the resort town of Karuizawa to gauge the response of foreign tourists. In about 1921 Shotei added the artistic name of Hiroaki. He occasionally also used the name Kōmei. In 1923 the Great Kanto earthquake (and subsequent fire) destroyed Watanabe's facilities; this included all woodblocks. Thus, Shotei recreated prior designs destroyed in the Great Kanto earthquake and produced new woodblocks in the shin-hanga style.

Before the earthquake, Shōtei had designed around five hundred prints for Watanabe, the blocks for which were destroyed in the fire; in the following years he continued working for Watanabe, producing around two hundred new designs, including greeting cards and small landscapes, and after 1925 he also created some larger shin-hanga-style prints, such as Fujikawa. In the 1930s he began working with other publishers, including Fusui Gabo and Shobisha, who allowed him greater creative freedom; his print Nekojarashi, for instance, was published by Fusui Gabo rather than Watanabe, likely because Watanabe, keen to keep his output distinct from the vulgarity associated with older nishiki-e, considered its nudity unsuitable for his clientele.

Fusui Gabo also published Shōtei's Ama in 1931, depicting a female diver in a manner recalling Utamaro. Shōtei also produced several bijinga prints and landscapes centred on Mount Fuji.

Shotei died of pneumonia on February 11, 1945. There is a persistent rumor that he died in the atomic bombing of Hiroshima but this is incorrect.

His works are held in the permanent collections of many museums worldwide, including the British Museum, the Princeton University Art Museum, the Museum of Fine Arts Boston, the University of Michigan Museum of Art, the National Museum of Asian Art, the Los Angeles County Museum of Art, the Arizona State University Art Museum, the Brunnier Art Museum, the Honolulu Museum of Art, and the Saint Louis Art Museum.

== Gallery ==
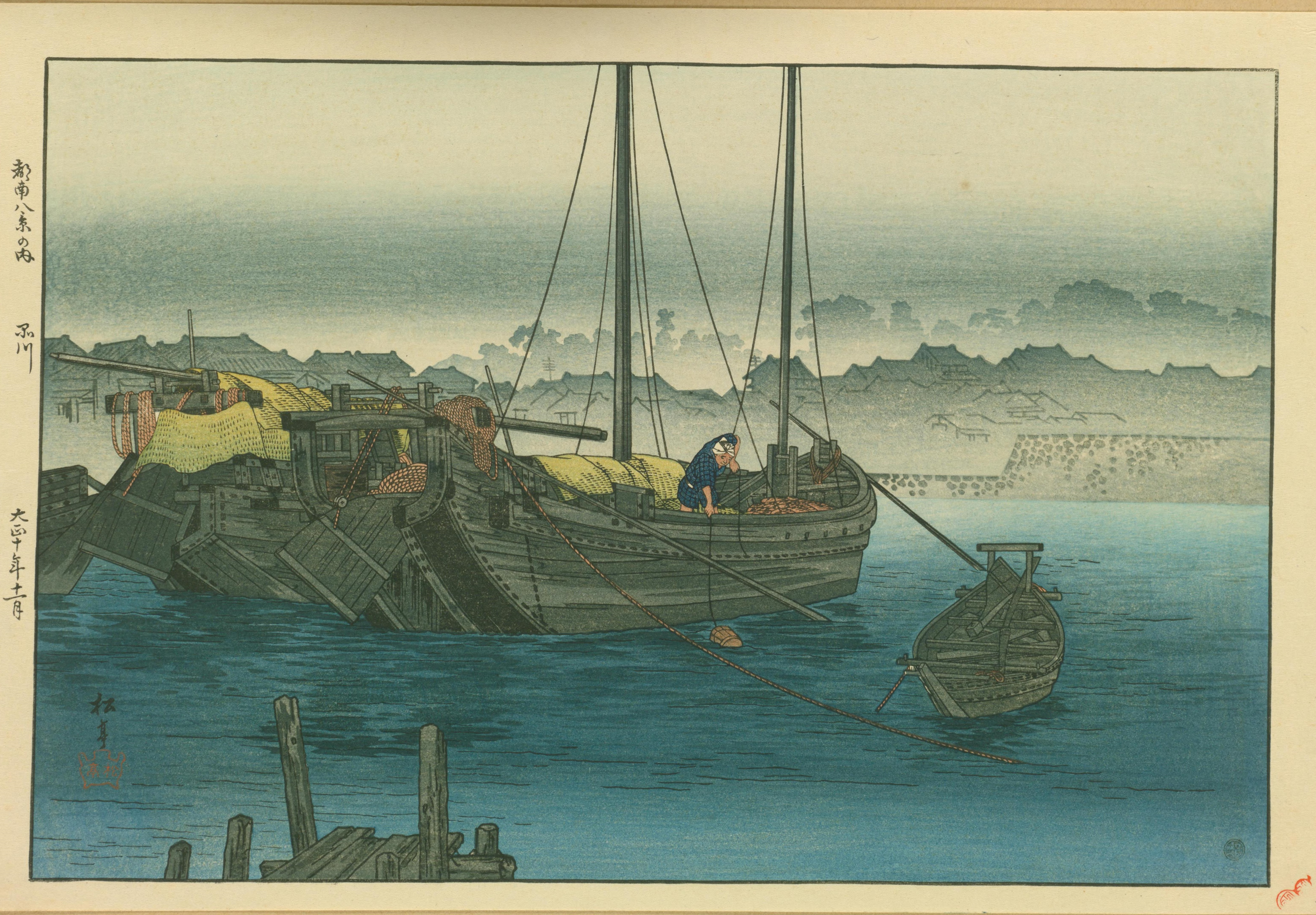
Shinagawa, from the series "8 views of the South of the Capital", 1921

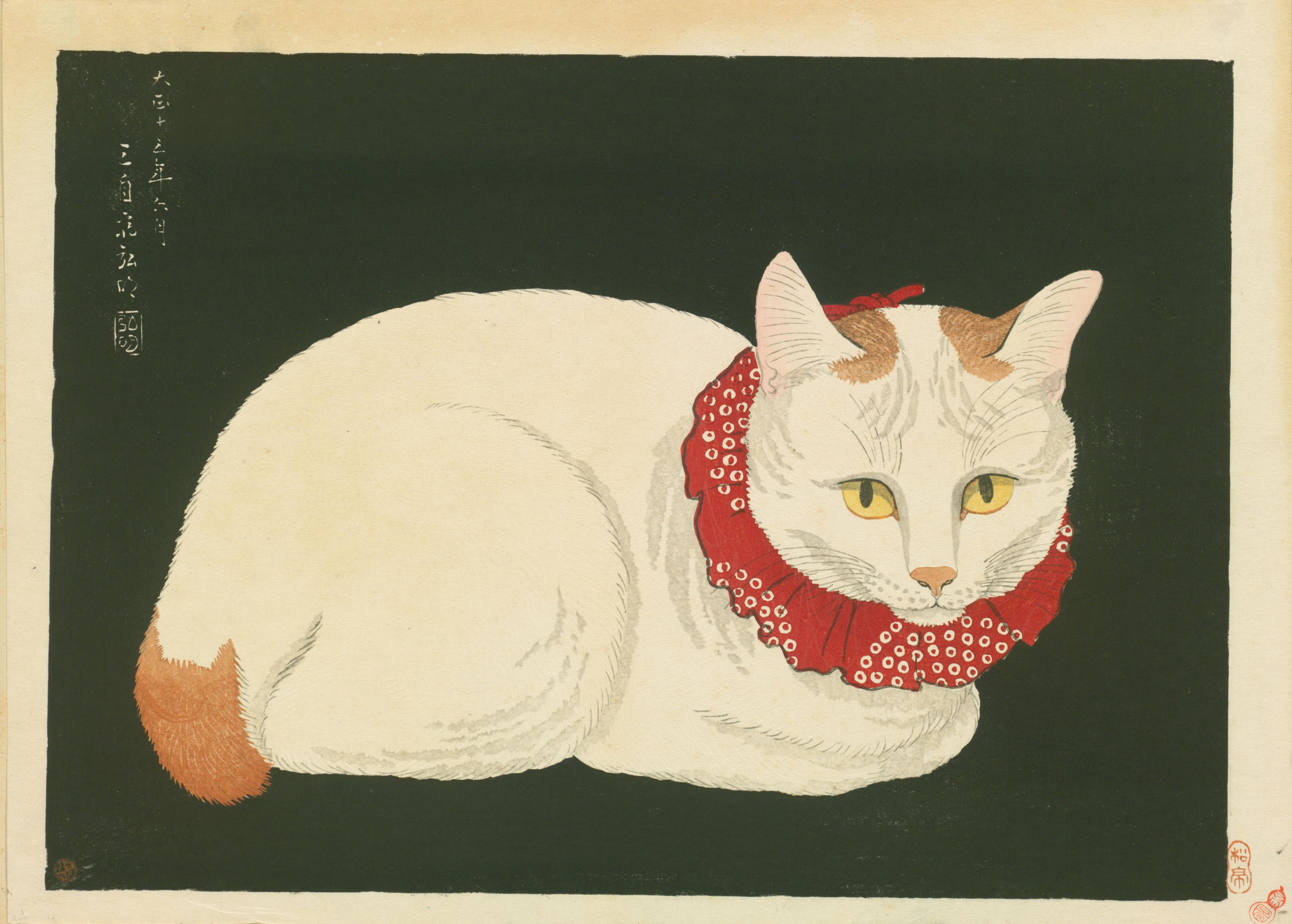
White Cat, 1924

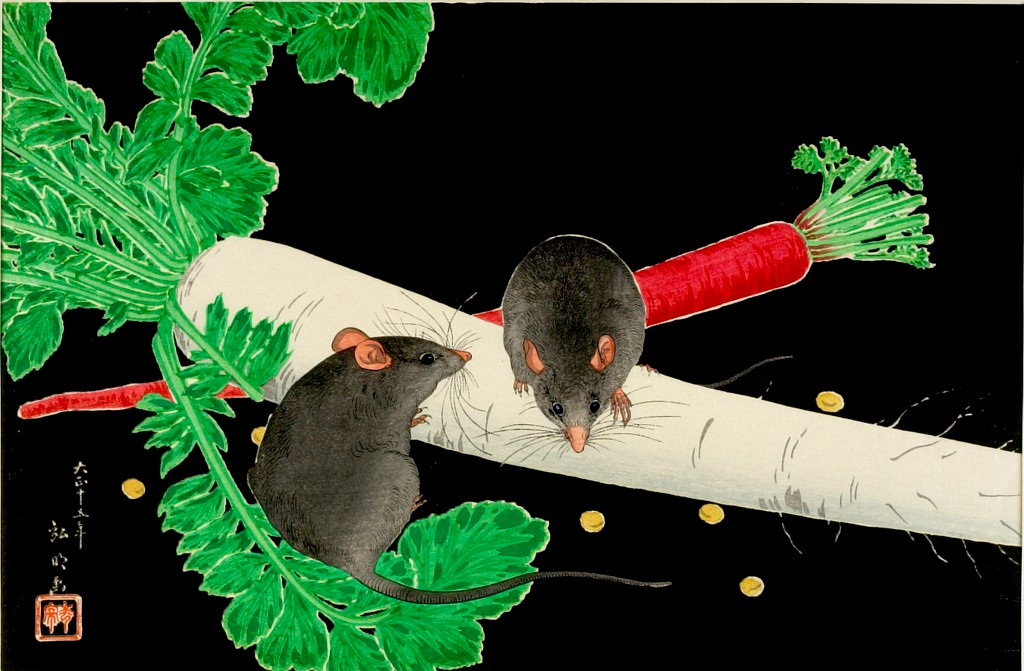
Rats and Radishes, 1926

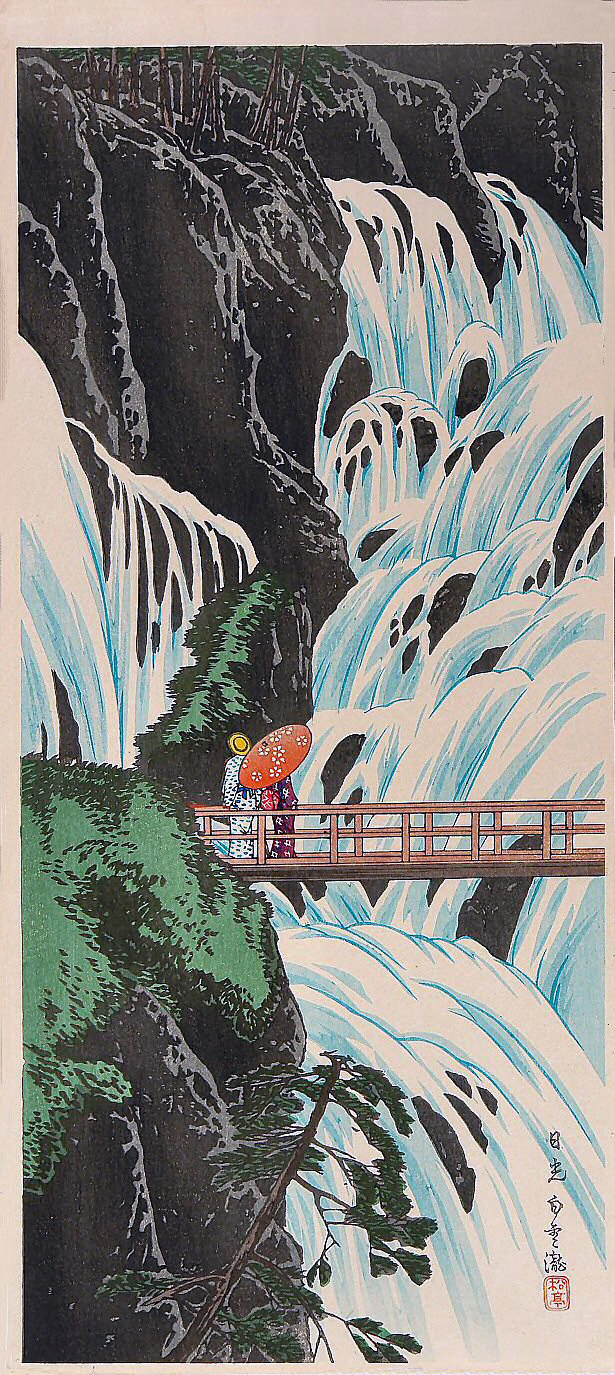
Bridge over waterfall, between 1924 and 1927

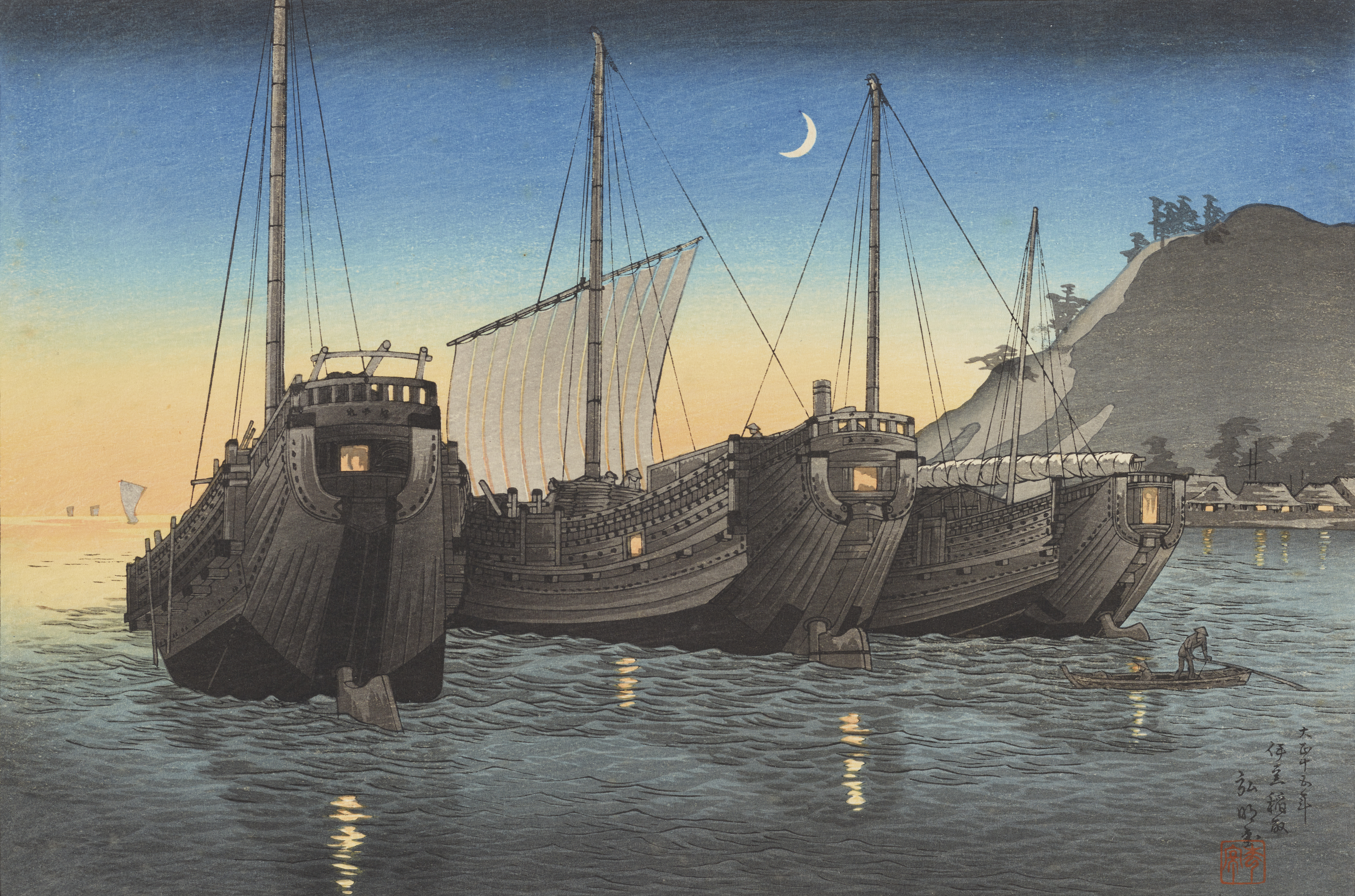
Junks in Inatori Bay, Izu, 1926

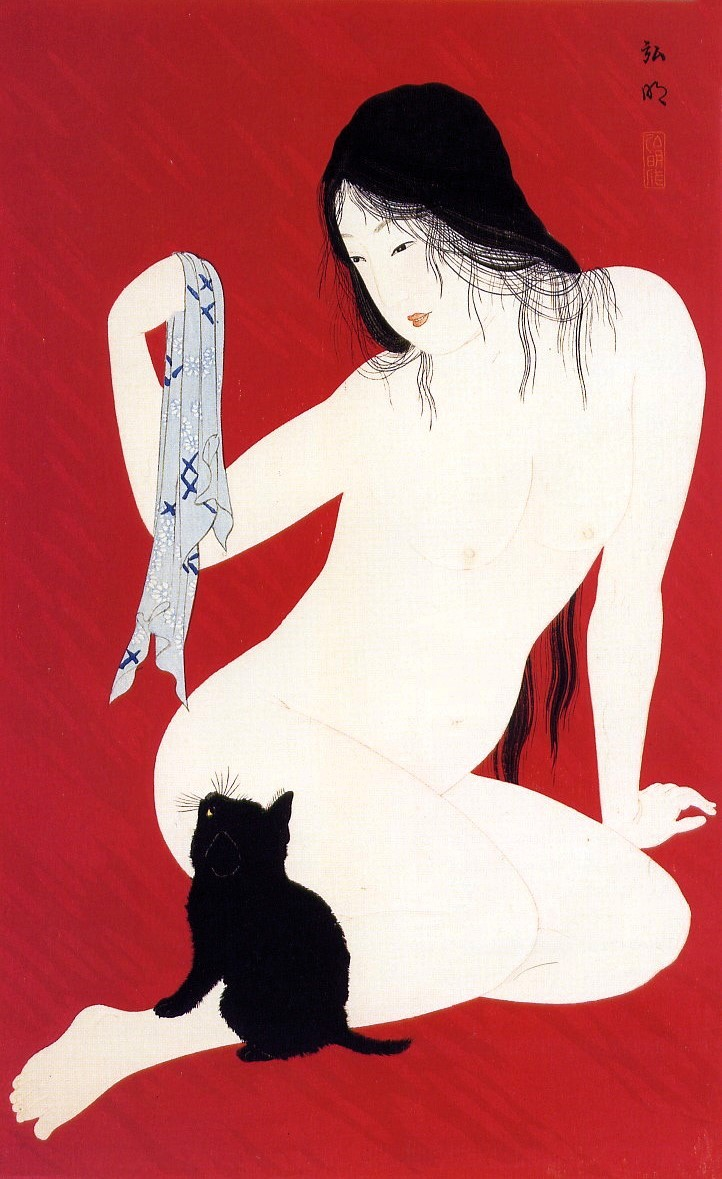
Playing with a cat, 1930

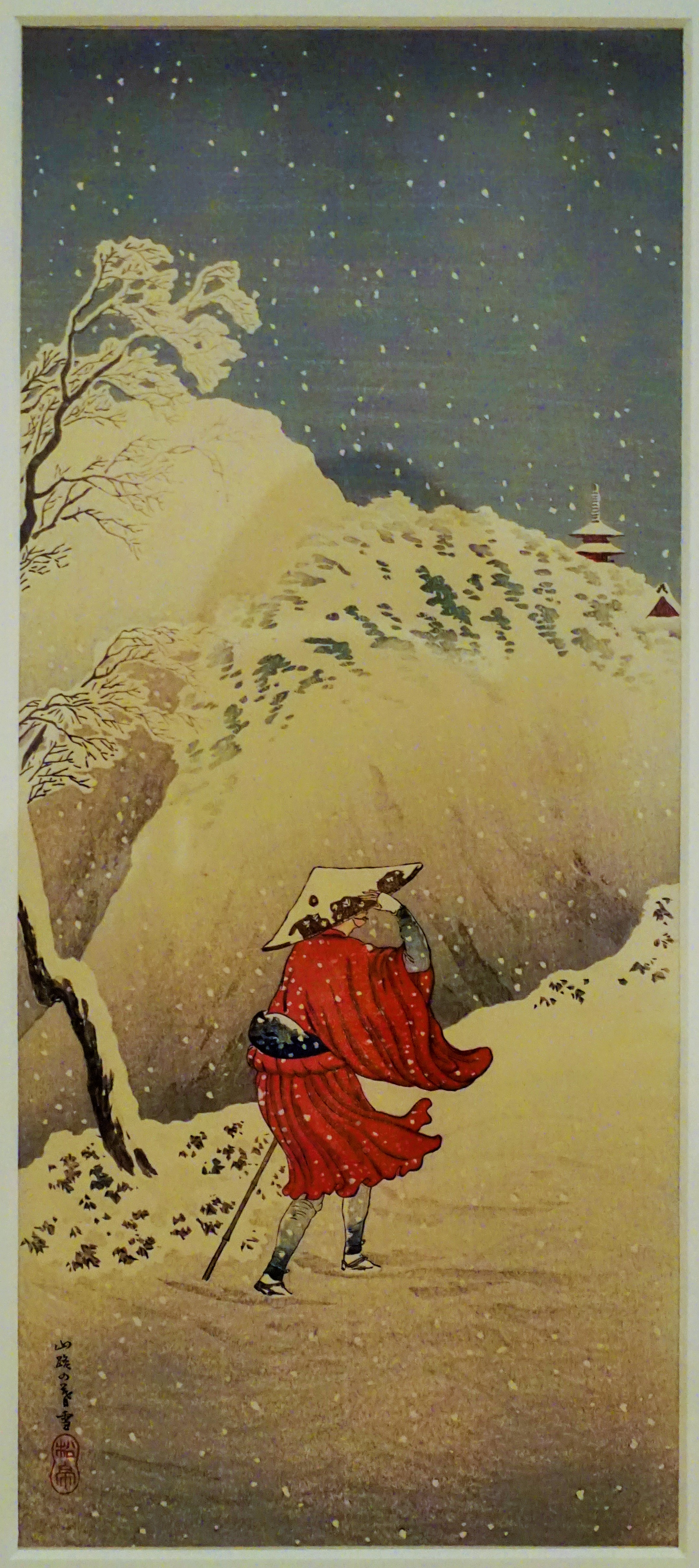
Figure with Snow Falling

== See also ==
- Hasui Kawase
