= Arai Yoshimune =

Japanese painter and draughtsman (1863–1941)

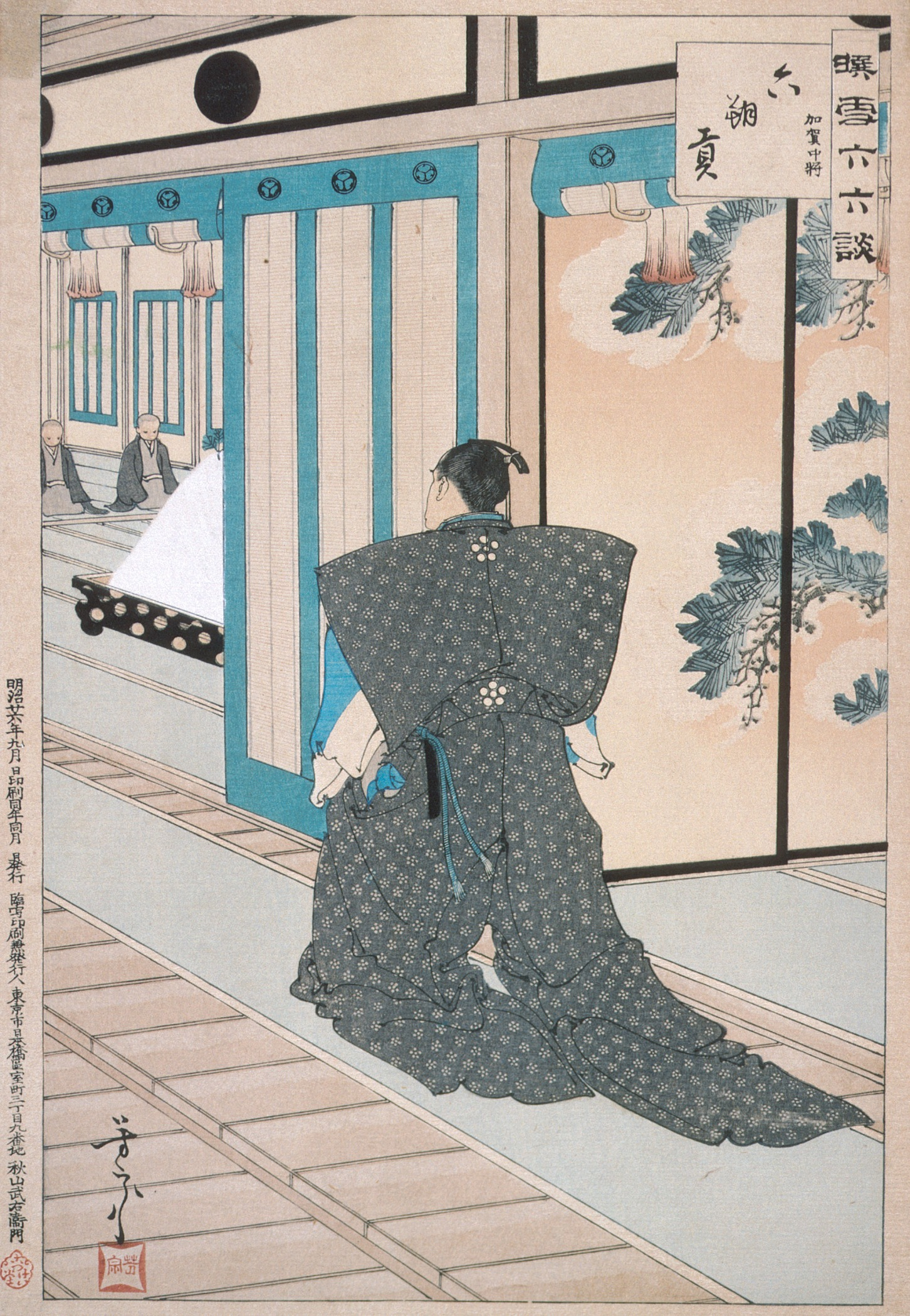

Arai Yoshimune (新井芳宗, 1863-1941) was a Japanese woodblock illustrator and print designer of the shin-hanga movement. Much of his work was published by Hasegawa or Nishinomiya.

== Family background ==
Arai Yoshimune was a name he adopted for himself in adulthood. He was the youngest son of the ukiyo-e artist Utagawa Yoshimune I, and after his father's death in 1880 he assumed the name Utagawa Yoshimune II. He was also known by the names Ichimatsusai and Matsusai. Previously, in 1875, he had become a disciple of Tsukioka Yoshitoshi and taken the name Tosetsu.

== Work ==
In 1882, together with Tsukioka Yoshitoshi, he joined the staff of the Illustrated Free Newspaper, and later drew many illustrations for newspapers and magazines. In 1886 he created an illustration for the story "The Normanton incident" for Kaishin Shimbun. In 1887, he produced a nishiki-e print of the Satsuma Rebellion. From 1893, he operated a shop called Gahakudo for a time, which he later handed over to his fellow disciple Matsui Eikichi. He later worked on woodblock prints and crepe books intended for foreign markets published by Hasegawa Takejirō and his second son Nishinomiya Yosaku, illustrating night scenes and beautiful women.

Arai Yoshimune was noted for his technique in depicting the effect of light at night or on water. His most popular works are part of a series called Hasegawa's Night Scenes.
