= Ohara Koson =

Japanese painter and printmaker

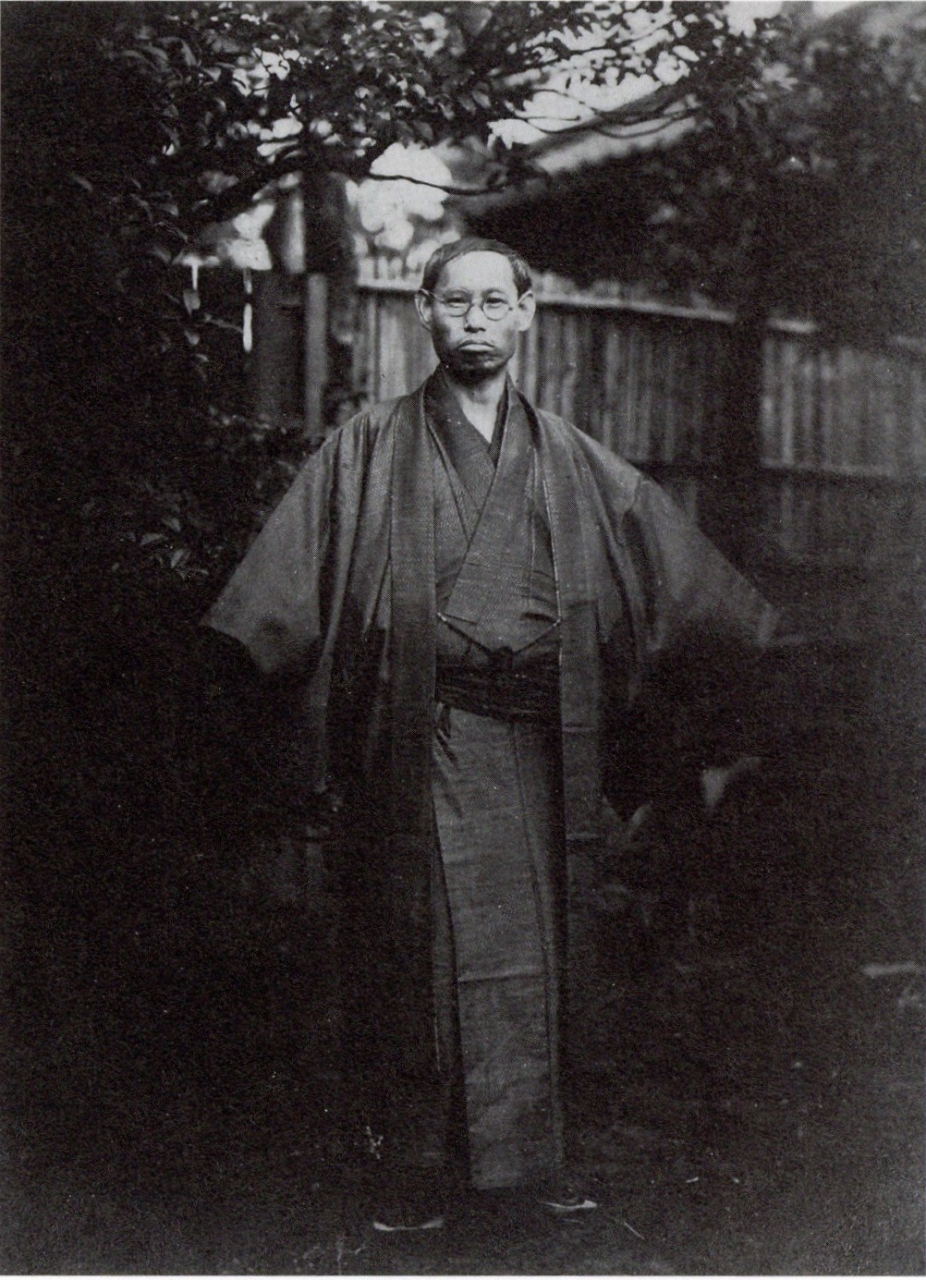
Ohara Koson, around the age of 53

Ohara Koson (also Ohara Hōson, Ohara Shōson) (Kanazawa 1877 – Tokyo 1945) was a Japanese painter and woodblock print designer of the late 19th and early 20th centuries, at the forefront of shinsaku-hanga and shin-hanga art movements.

Ohara Koson was famous as a master of kachō-e (bird-and-flower) designs. Throughout a prolific career, in which he created around 500 prints, he went by three different titles: Ohara Hōson (小原豊邨), Ohara Shōson (小原祥邨) and Ohara Koson.

== Biography ==
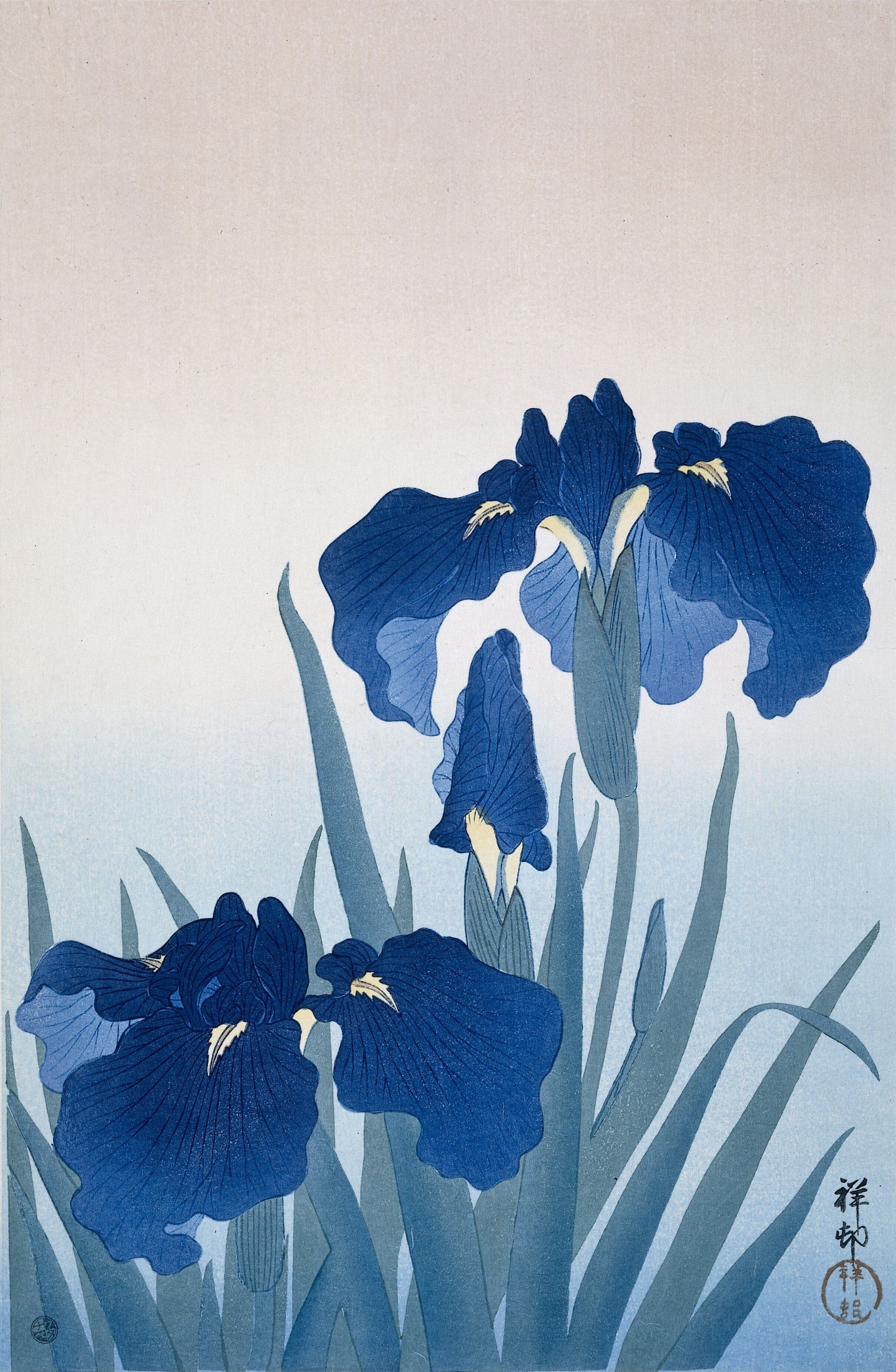
Blue irises, 1900–1930, Rijksmuseum.

He was born Ohara Matao; it is thought that he started training in painting and design at the Ishikawa Prefecture Technical School in 1889–1893. He also studied painting with Suzuki Kason (1860–1919), although accounts differ on whether this happened during his school years or after he moved to Tokyo in the middle to late 1890s. In keeping with Japanese custom, on completing his training he changed his name from Matao to Koson, meaning "son of Kason", in recognition of his debt to his teacher.

Around 1900 he taught at the Tokyo School of Fine Arts (Tokyo Bijutsu Gakkō), where he met Ernest Fenollosa, then a professor at Tokyo Imperial University, who would later, as curator of the Japanese art department at the Museum of Fine Arts, Boston, ask him to send numerous kachō-e prints to the United States.

In Tokyo, he produced some ukiyo-e triptychs illustrating episodes of the Russo-Japanese War, but most of his production was prints of birds-and-flowers (kachō-e), , typically flat in colour and produced in the borderless naga-ōban format. He worked at first with publishers Akiyama Buemon (Kokkeidō) and Matsuki Heikichi (Daikokuya), signing his work Koson. Starting around 1926, he became associated with the publisher Watanabe Shōzaburō, and signed his work Shōson. He also worked with the publisher Kawaguchi, signing his works Hōson.

Through his association with Watanabe, for whom he produced ōban-format prints in unusually vivid colours, and with the support and promotion of Ernest Fenollosa, Ohara's work was exhibited abroad, and his prints sold well, particularly in the United States. He was appointed professor at the newly founded Tokyo University of the Arts (Tokyo Geijutsu Daigaku) and served as a consultant to the Tokyo National Museum. Largely unknown in Japan during most of his career, his prints had to be reimported once they became popular there from 1970 onward. He was active designing prints until at least 1935, and died at his home in Tokyo in 1945.

His work is held in several museums worldwide, including the Toledo Museum of Art, the Brooklyn Museum, the British Museum, the University of Michigan Museum of Art, the Chazen Museum of Art, the Museum of Fine Arts, Boston, the Harvard Art Museums, the Rijksmuseum, the Carnegie Museum of Art, the Saint Louis Art Museum, the Indianapolis Museum of Art, the Museum of New Zealand, the Museum of Anthropology at the University of British Columbia, the Birmingham Museum of Art, the John and Mable Ringling Museum of Art, and the Clark Art Institute.

The Manggha museum in Krakow, Poland held a large retrospective in 2021 from the collection of Romanian musical artist Adrian Ciceu, brother of Eugen Cicero.

== Gallery ==
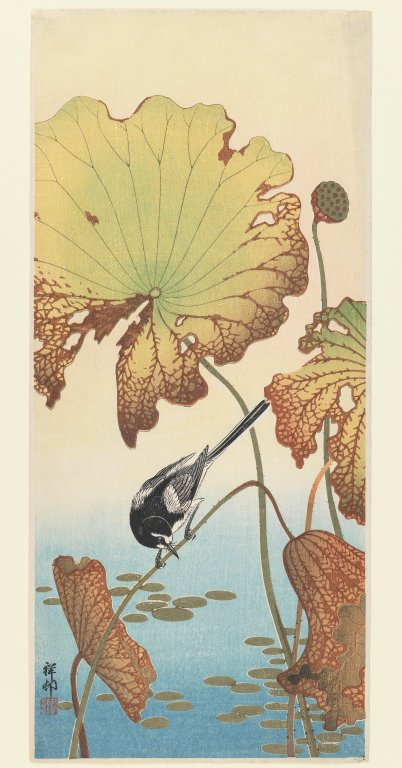
Wagtail and Lotus, between 1912 and 1918, woodblock print, 37.7 × 16.4 cm. Brooklyn Museum

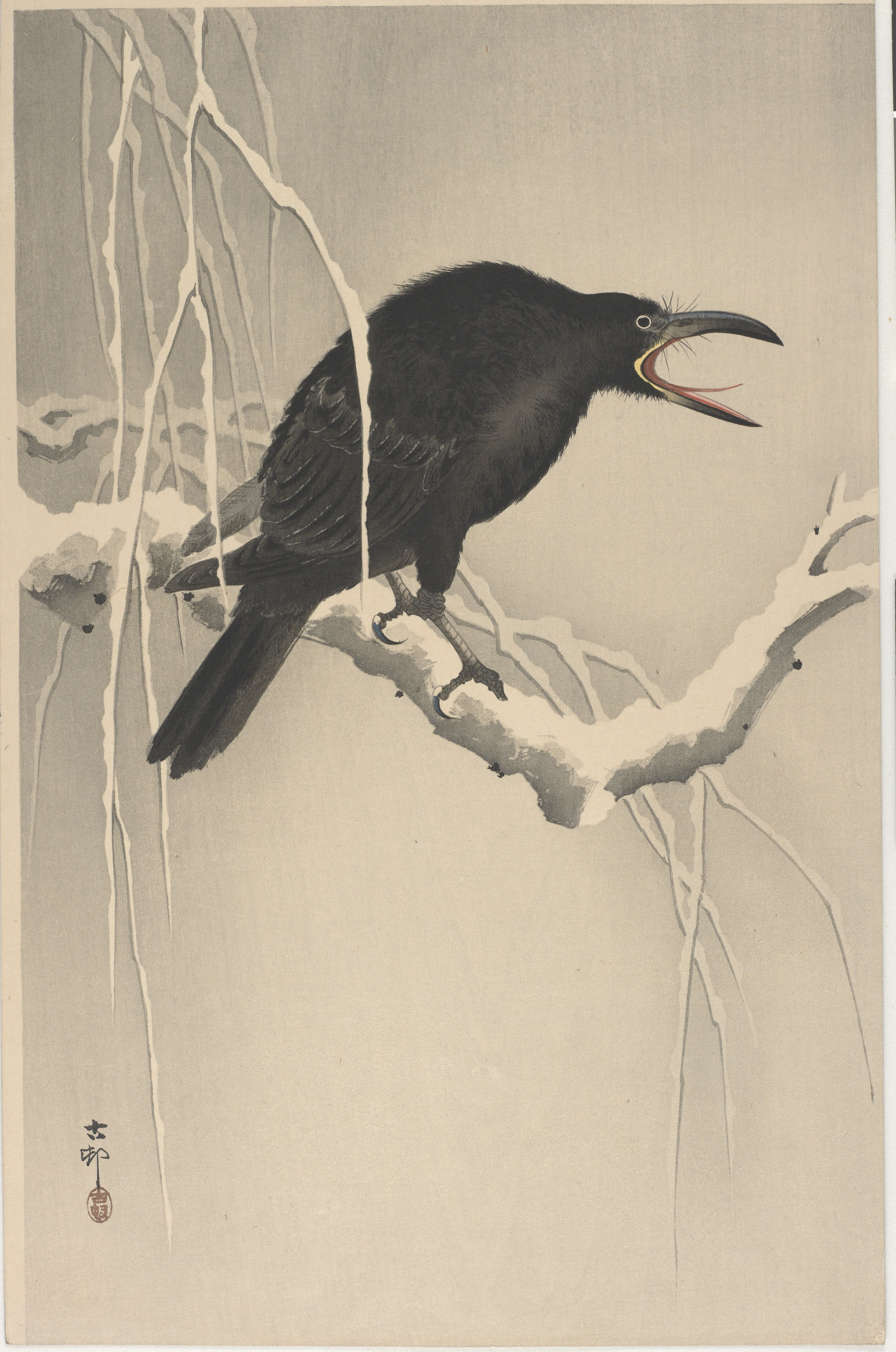
Cawing crow, c. 1900s

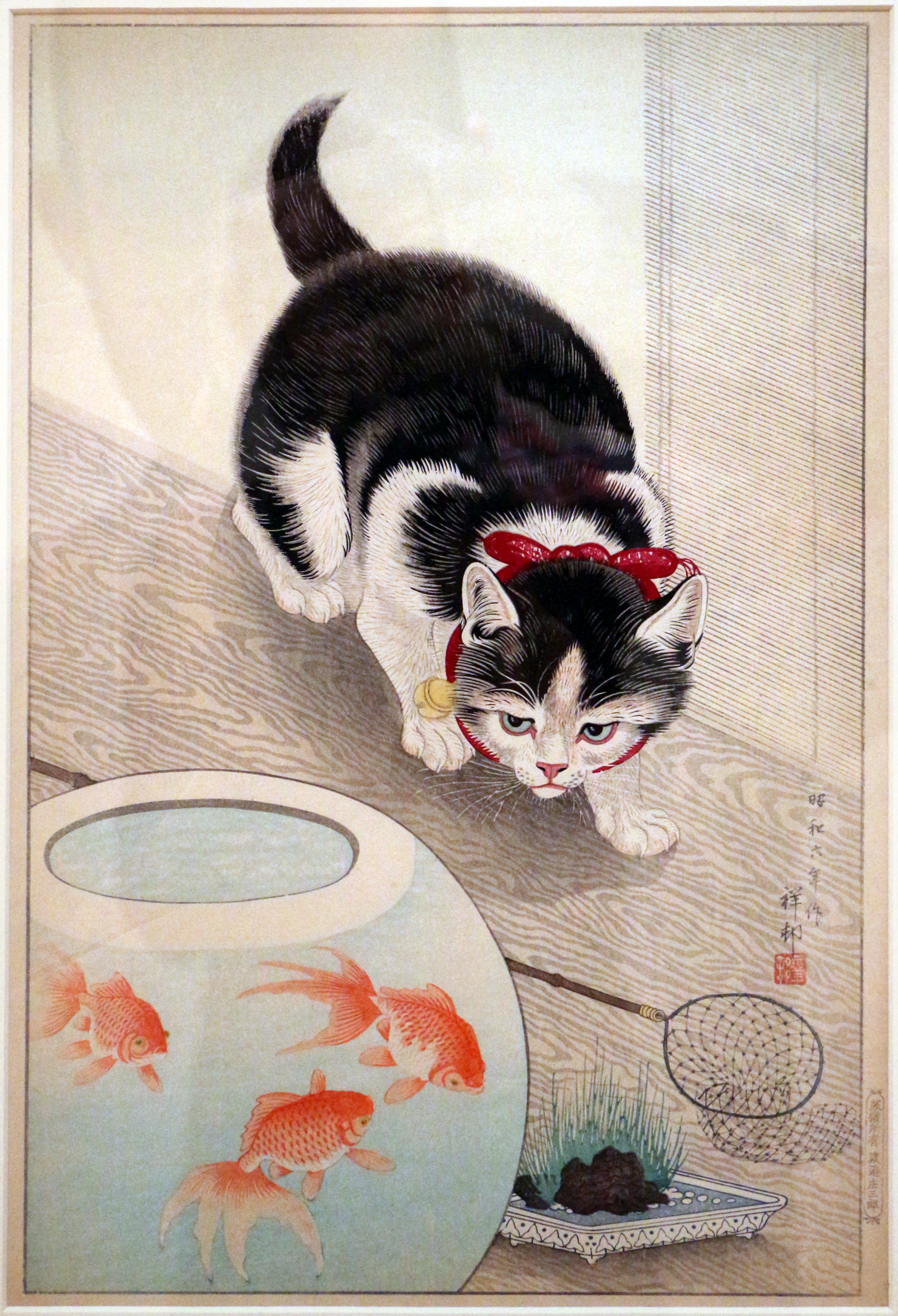
Cat and Bowl of Goldfish, 1933

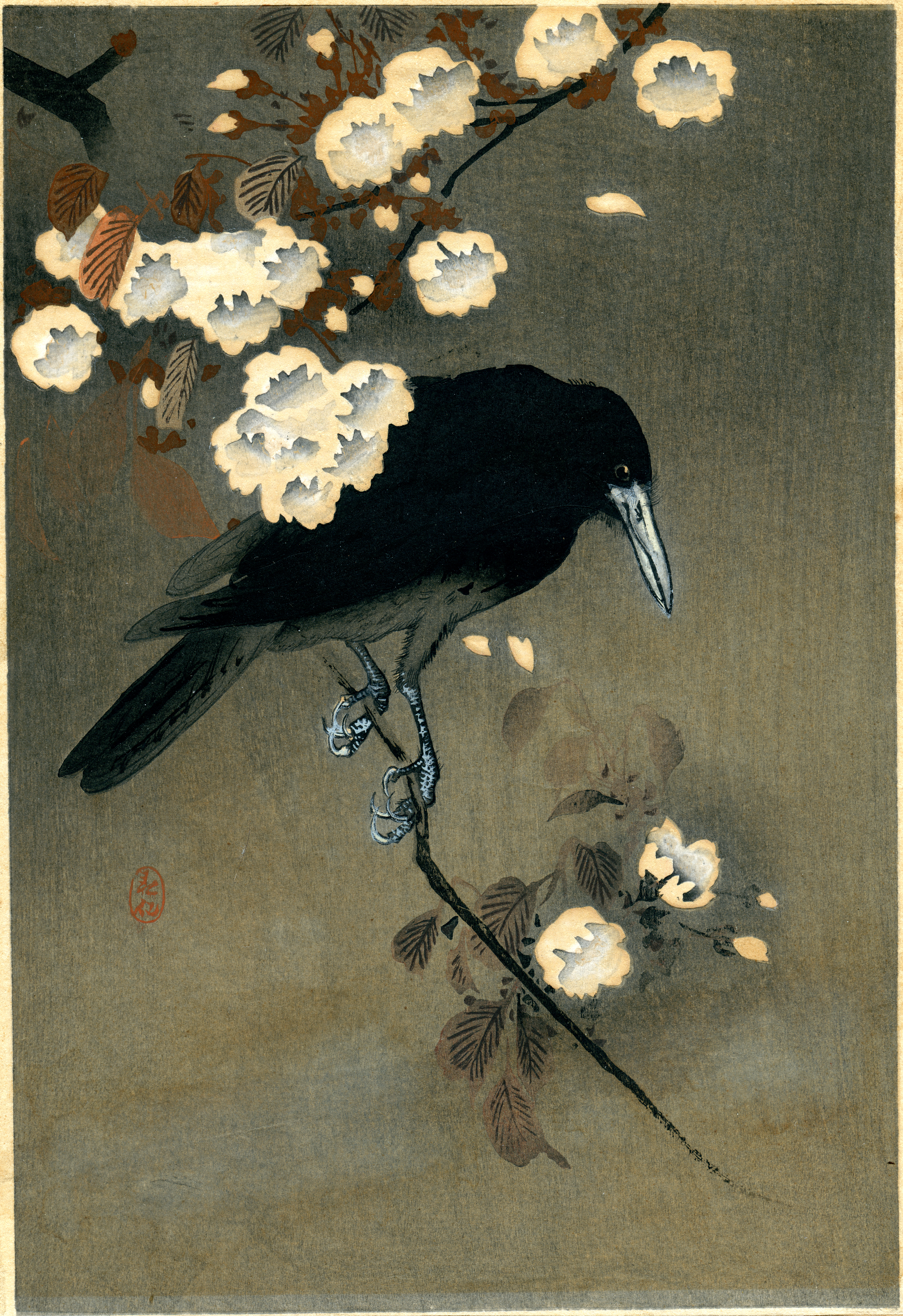
Crow and Blossom, c. 1910

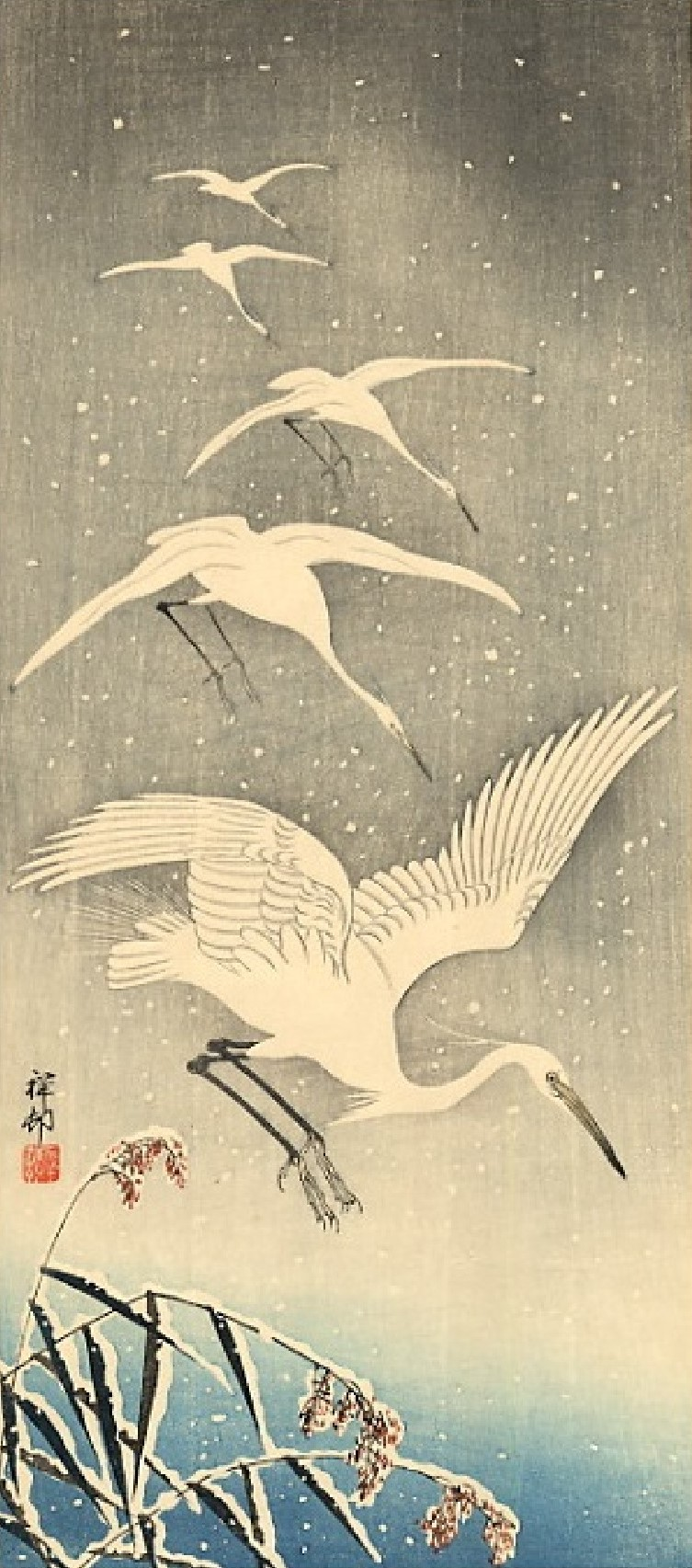
Five Egrets Descending in Snow, c. 1920s

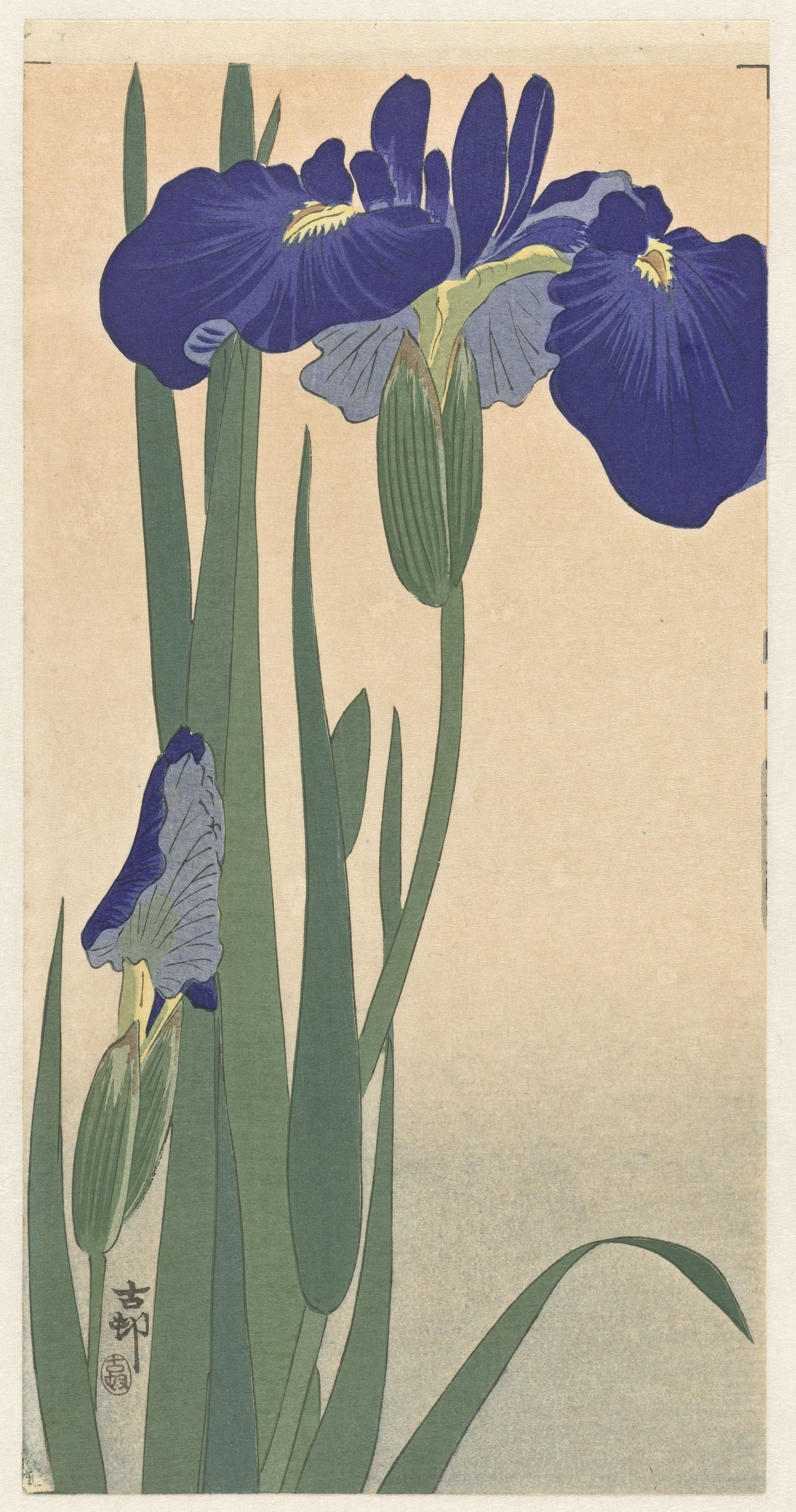
Blue Irises, date unknown

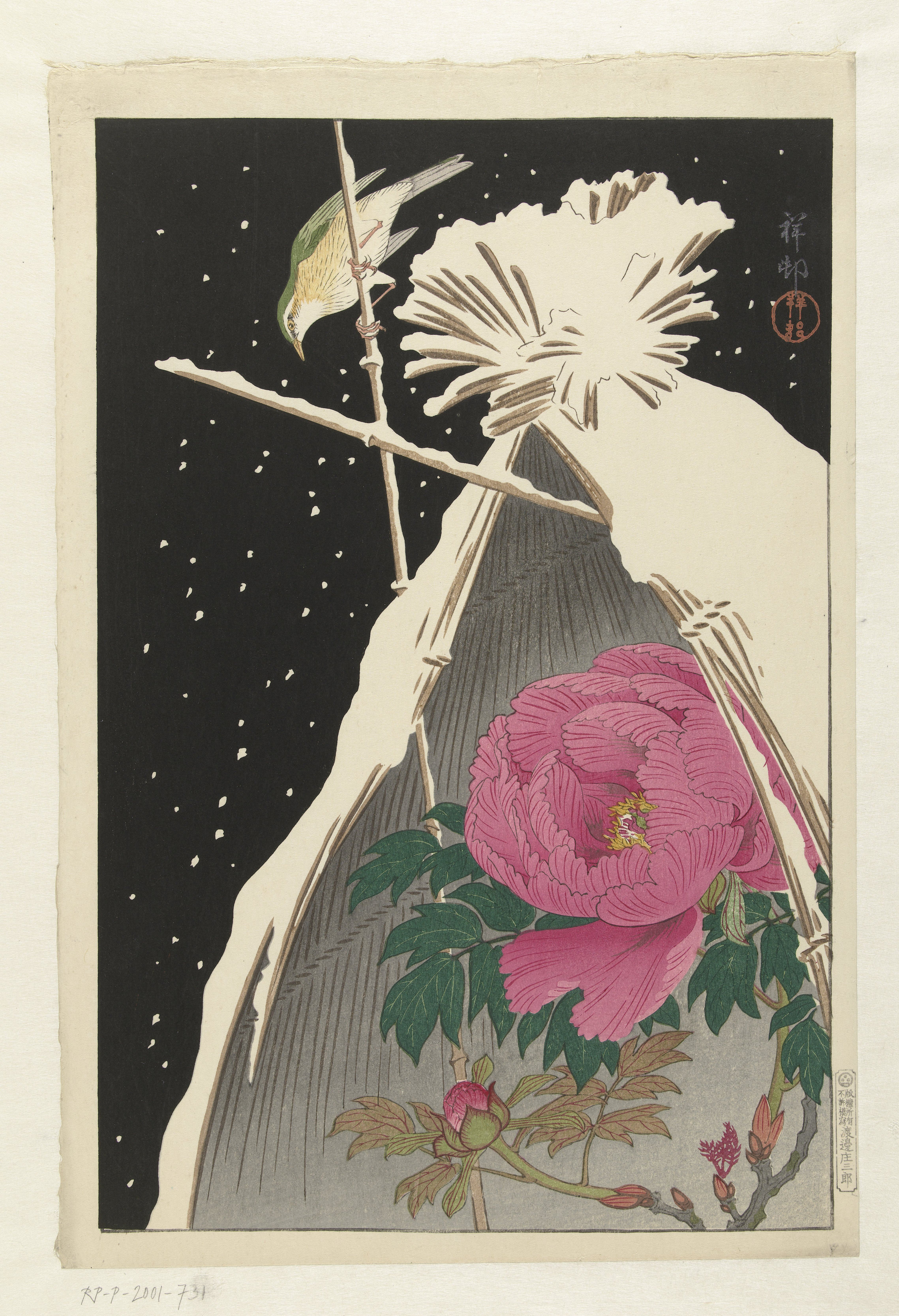
Siberian Blue Nightingale near a peony under a snowy sheaf, c.1925-c.1936

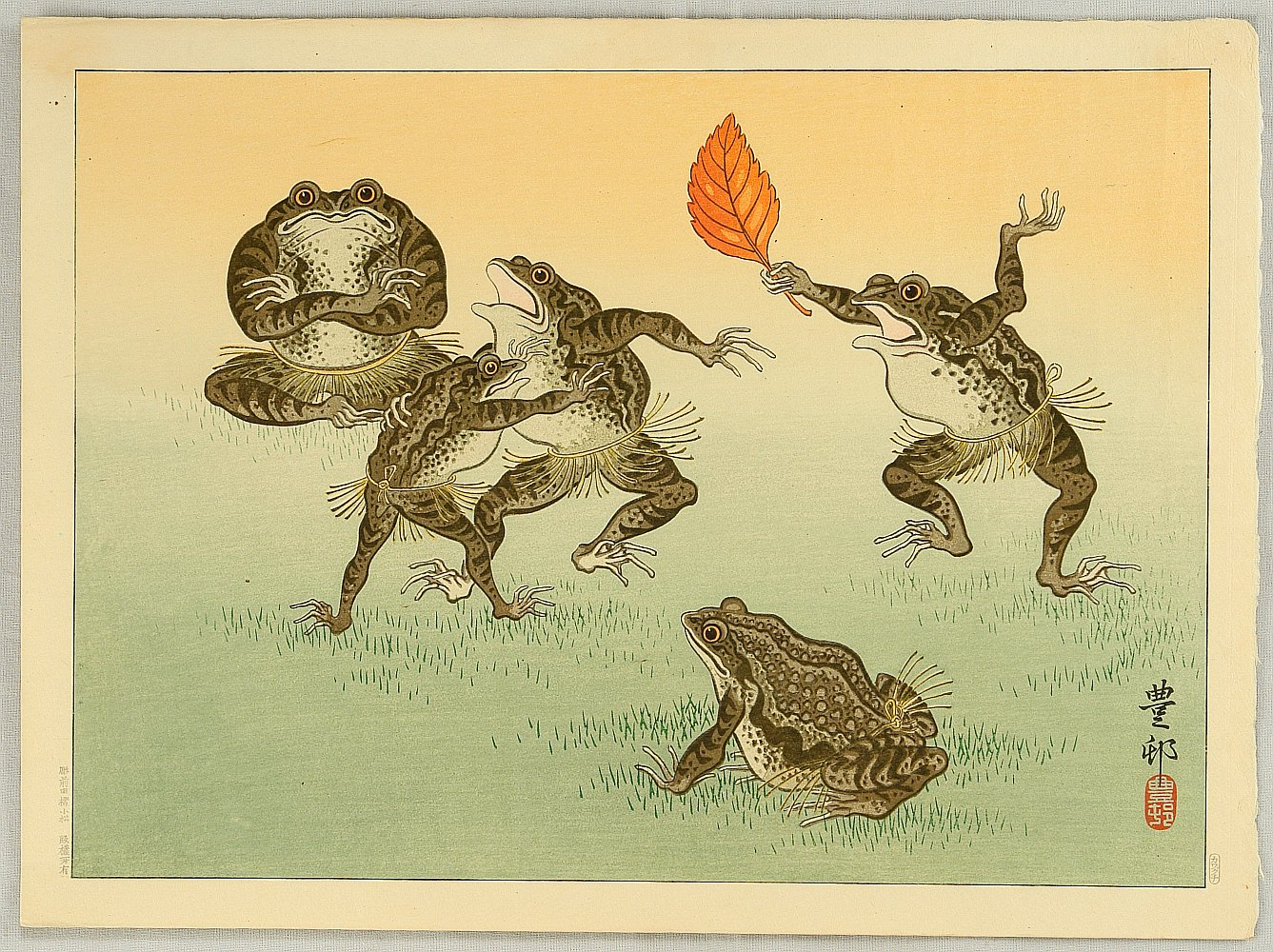
Sumō-wrestling toads, c. 1930

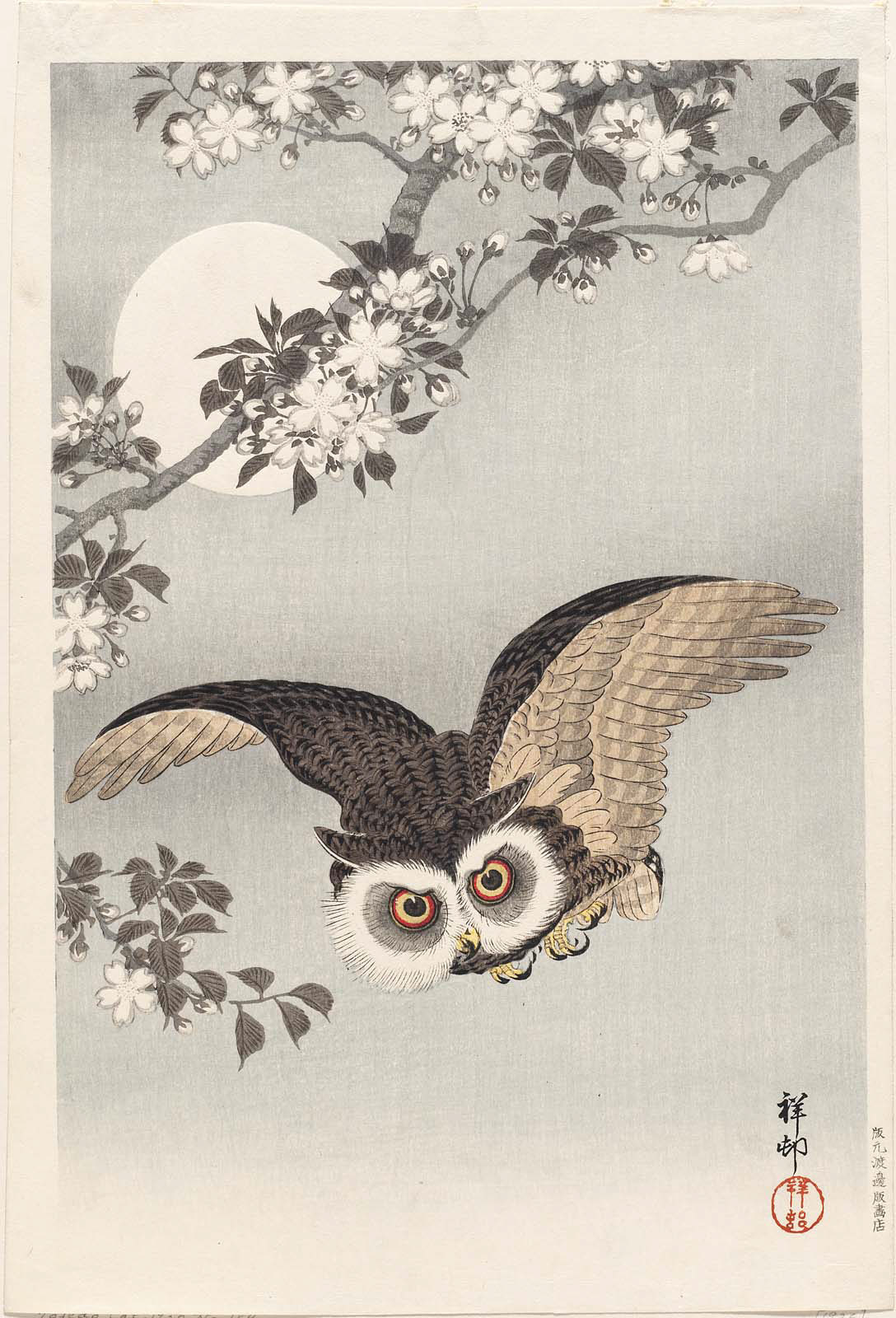
Scops Owl, Cherry Blossoms, and Moon, 1926

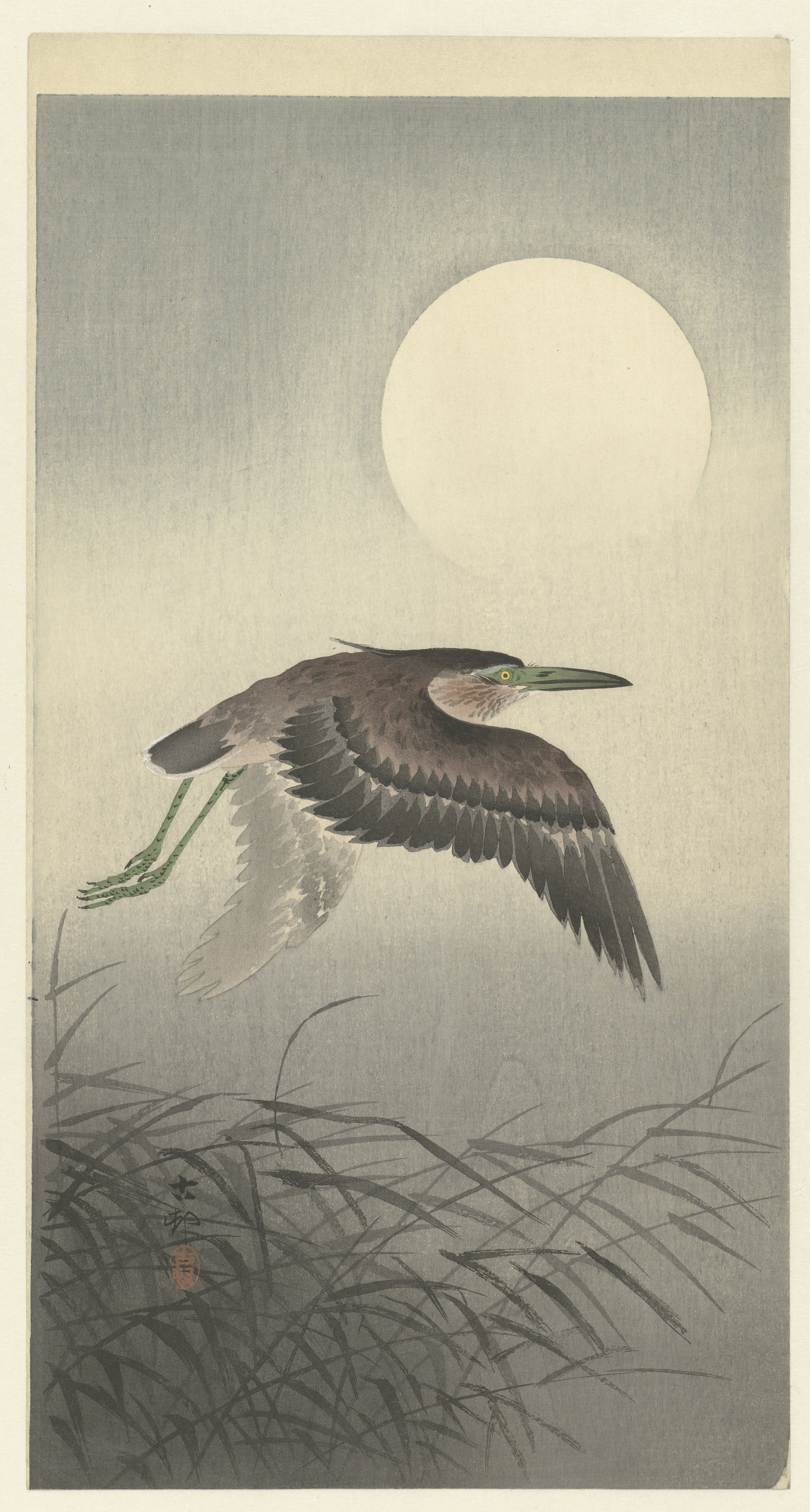
Heron at full moon
