= Ceferí Olivé =

Spanish artist (1907-1995)

Ceferí Olivé i Cabré (born in Reus in 1907, died in the same town in 1995) was a Catalan painter.

== Biography ==
Ceferí Olivé studied with master painter Tomàs Bergadà. He specialized in watercolor. He used to sign his paintings with his name in Castilian Spanish: Ceferino Olivé. Many of his paintings are Mediterranean landscapes.

He lived most of his life in Reus, but also spent some time in Barcelona, where he painted railway scenes and shipyards. He also travelled to some European countries.

Most of his exhibitions were in Barcelona and Madrid and Bilbao.

== Awards and posthumous honors ==
Ceferí Olivé is regarded as one of the best watercolor painters in Spain. He won also the first medal of the International Art Gallery in London and an award of the Railway painting Exhibition in Spain. Among the other awards he won, the following deserve mention:

- Galeria Pictoria award, Barcelona, 1941,
- National Watercolor Prize, 1942
- Fortuny Medal in 1942 and in 1943
- Medal of honour of the National Watercolor Exhibition, 1947
- Creu de Sant Jordi in 1985.

There is a street in Reus named after him.
