= Natori Shunsen =

Japanese woodblock printer

Shunsen Natori (名取春仙, Natori Shunsen; February 7, 1886 – March 30, 1960) was a Japanese woodblock printer, considered by many to be the last master in the art of kabuki yakusha-e "actor pictures".

== Biography ==
He was born Natori Yoshinosuke, the fifth son of a silk merchant, in Yamanashi Prefecture. His family settled in Tokyo shortly after his birth, where he remained until his death in 1960. His schoolmates in these early years included the future nihonga painters Kawabata Ryūshi, Okamoto Ippei and Tōgyū Okumura.

From the age of eleven he studied with traditional Nihonga (Japanese-style) painter Kubota Beisen, and was given his artist's name "Shunsen". He also studied under Hirafuku Hyakusui, whose influence led him to join the Museikai, a group promoting greater realism within nihonga painting, and with whom, together with Ogawa Usen and others, he went on to found the Sangokai; in 1907 he won a prize for his hanging scroll Butai at the Nihon Bijutsuin exhibition. He subsequently studied at the Tokyo School of Fine Arts.He subsequently studied at the Tokyo School of Fine Arts.

Despite the 1907 prize, Shunsen lost confidence in his prospects as a painter; in 1919 he committed himself to newspaper illustration, work he had already taken up intermittently from 1907. From 1909 he spent several years on the literary staff of the Asahi Shimbun, building a reputation as a book illustrator in the late Meiji era that brought him into contact with leading writers of the day, including Natsume Sōseki. Natori Shunsen developed an interest in kabuki actor portraits while working as an illustrator for the newspaper Asahi Shimbun. During this time, he had the opportunity to meet the publisher Watanabe Shōzaburō, who was the primary force behind the shin-hanga movement. His career as a designer of kabuki actor woodblock prints began in 1915, when he contributed thirty portraits and two cover designs to the five-volume Shibai Shin nigao-e. In 1916, after seeing Shunsen's exhibited portrait of Nakamura Ganjirō as Kamiya Jihei, Watanabe was immediately taken with his work and produced two actor prints from his designs that year and the next, nine years before their celebrated 1925 series.

In 1925, Natori and Watanabe worked together on a series of 36 actor portraits. This series contains some of Natori's finest kabuki designs. Watanabe lavishly produced each print in a limited edition of 150 and sold them only by subscription. The series lasted through 1929, followed by a supplemental series of 15 actor prints produced through 1931. The 1925–29 series, aimed principally at the Western market, was shown in its entirety at the Toledo Museum of Art's first exhibition of shin-hanga in 1930. Across his career Natori produced more than eighty single-sheet actor prints, regarded by some as the finest and most genuinely theatrical of the shin-hanga movement.

Natori's actor portraits were mainly in the ōkubi-e (large head) format which allowed him to focus on the expression and emotions of the character's face.

Two of his portraits have drawn particular attention: his depiction of Kataoka Nizaemon XI as Kakogawa Honzō, disguised as a wandering komusō monk with a shakuhachi flute and a woven amigasa hat concealing his face, in a design praised as austere and evocative of Honzō's spirit of self-sacrifice; and his 1926 portrait of Ichikawa Ennosuke II as the thief Ikuda Kakudayū in Toyama seidan, a bold composition, said to have been modelled on a contemporary photograph of the actor, that shows clear Western influence in its shading and foreshortening, set against a black background that heightens the print's menace and contrasts with the sitter's brown-and-yellow checked kimono.

In the late 1920s Natori also designed a small number of bijin-ga prints, for both Watanabe and the publisher Katō Jūji; these were generally received as flatter and less striking than his vibrant kabuki portraits, likely because they were not executed in the ōkubi-e format.

He continued to work as an artist in the kabuki theater, but did not design any other actor prints until the early 1950s. From 1951 to 1954, he again collaborated with Watanabe on another series of 30 actor prints. Like the earlier series, these designs were beautifully printed and are very expressive, especially the ōkubi-e portrait.

His 22-year-old daughter died of pneumonia in 1958. He and his wife committed suicide by poison at their daughter's grave two years later.

His works are held in several museums worldwide, including the British Museum, the Portland Art Museum, the Museum of Fine Arts, Boston, the Museum of New Zealand, the Carnegie Museum of Art, the Indianapolis Museum of Art, the Minneapolis Institute of Art, the University of Michigan Museum of Art, the National Museum of Modern Art, Tokyo, the Harvard Art Museums, the Honolulu Museum of Art, the Los Angeles County Museum of Art, the Saint Louis Art Museum, the Toledo Museum of Art, the Art Gallery of New South Wales, the National Gallery of Australia, and the Brooklyn Museum.

== Gallery ==
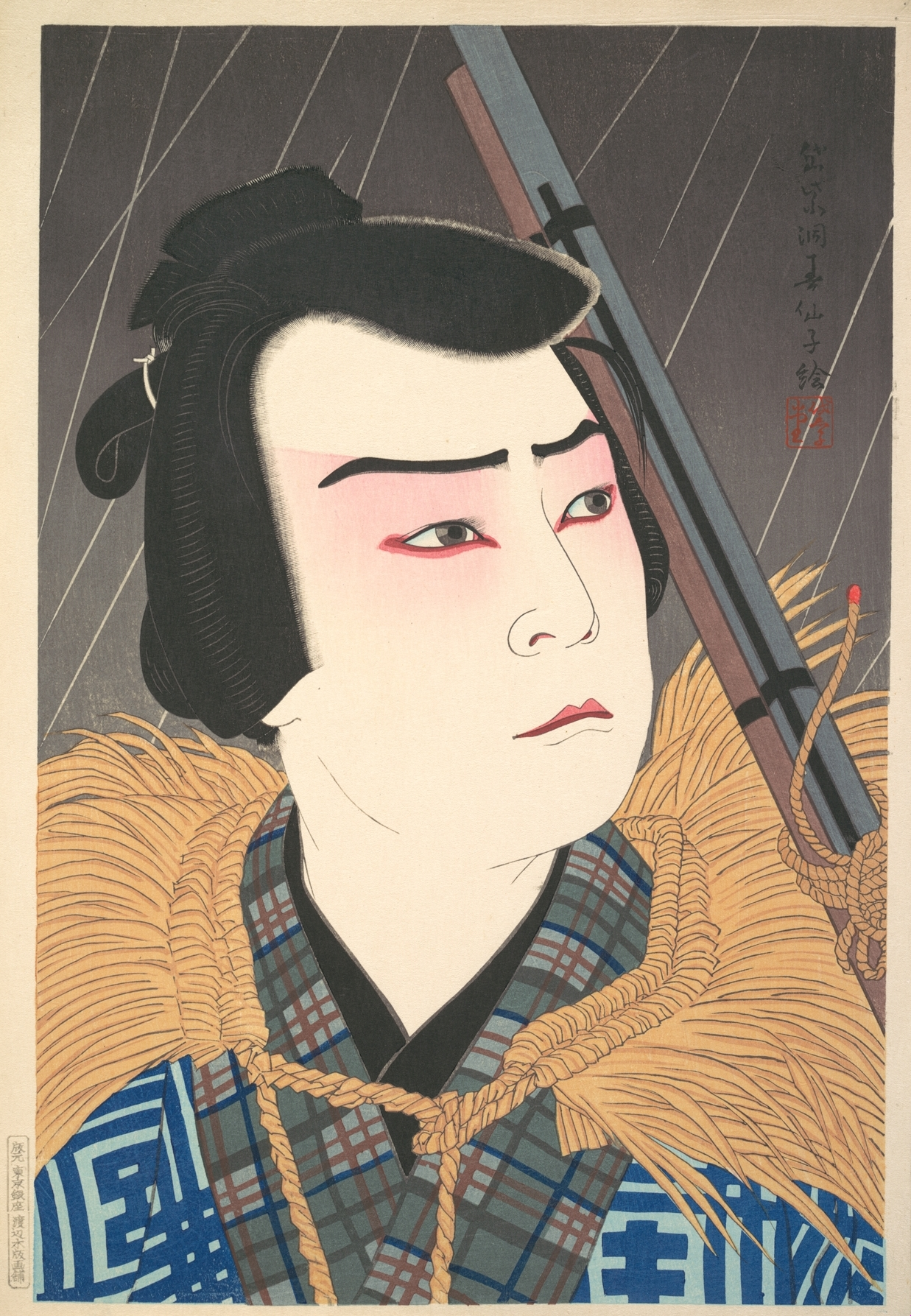
Onoe Kikugorō VI as Hayano Kampei, 1929

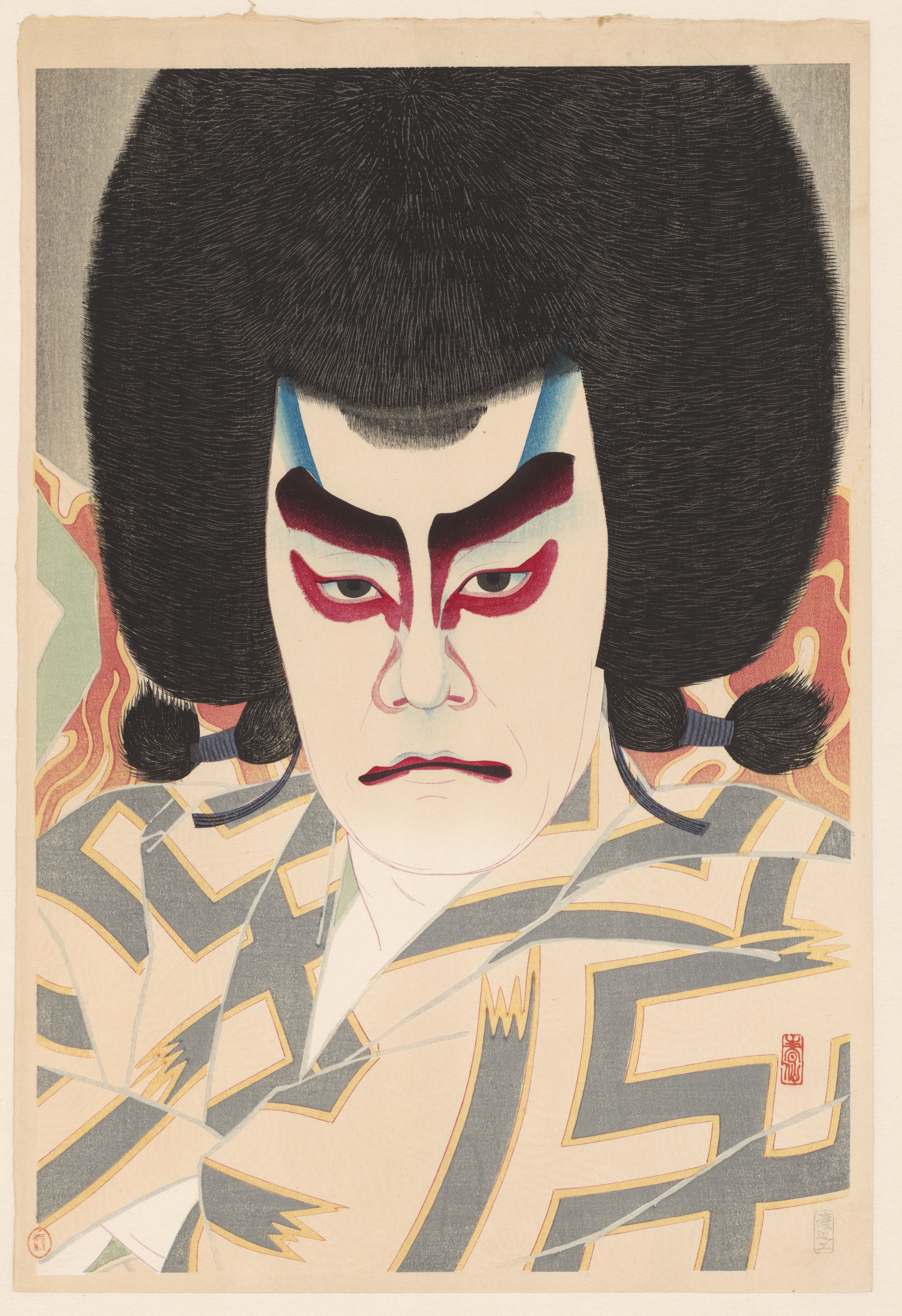
Ichikawa Sadanji II as Narukami, 1926

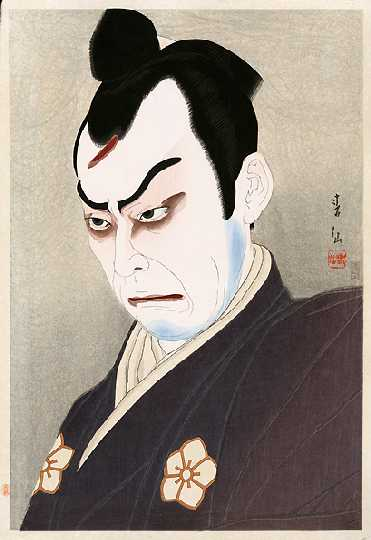
Nakamura Kichiemon I as Akechi Mitsuhide, 1926

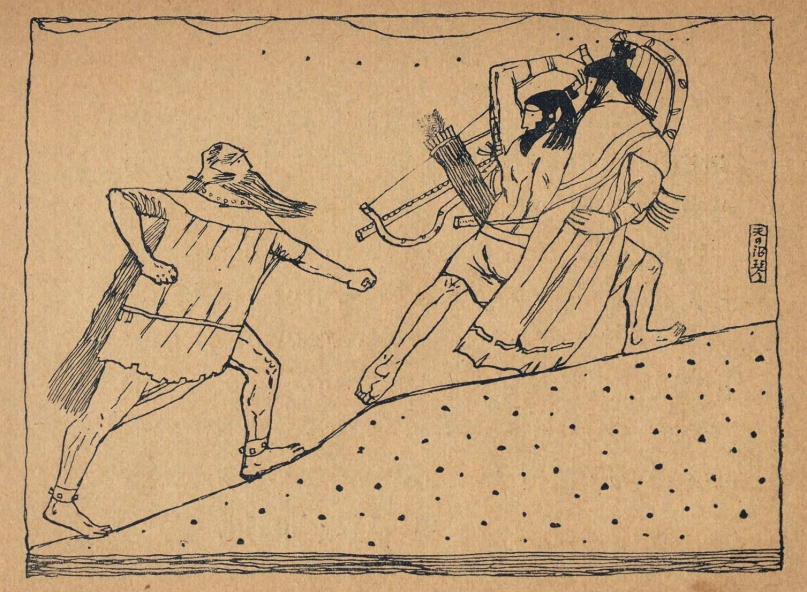
1918

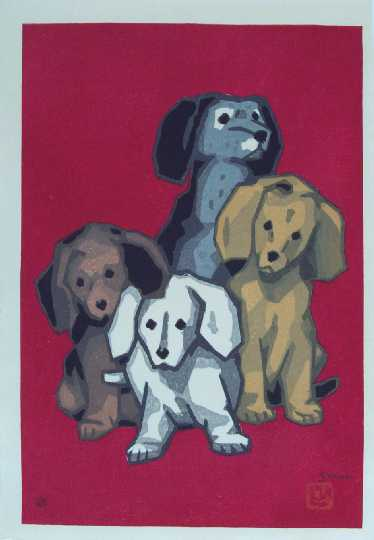
1950

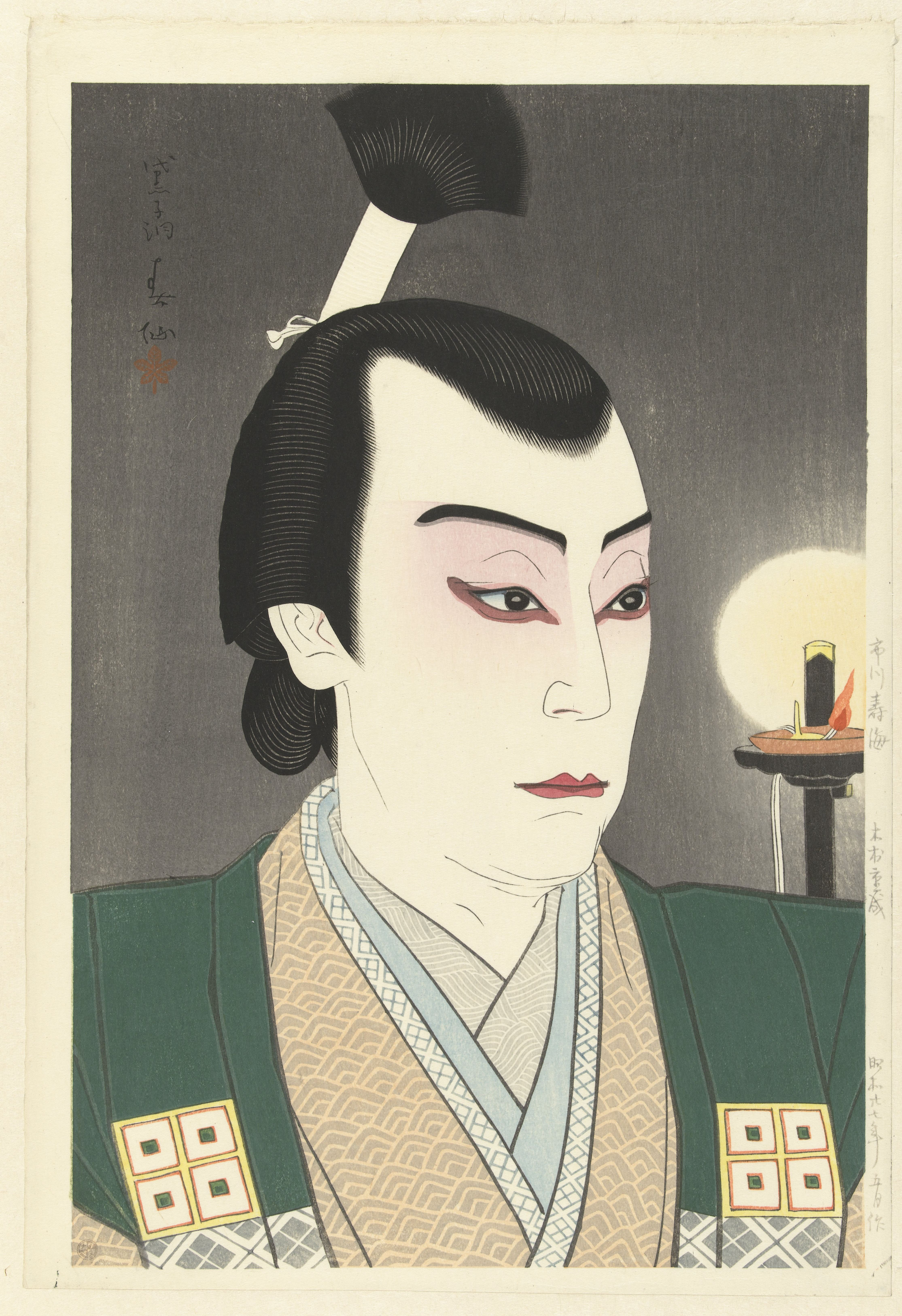

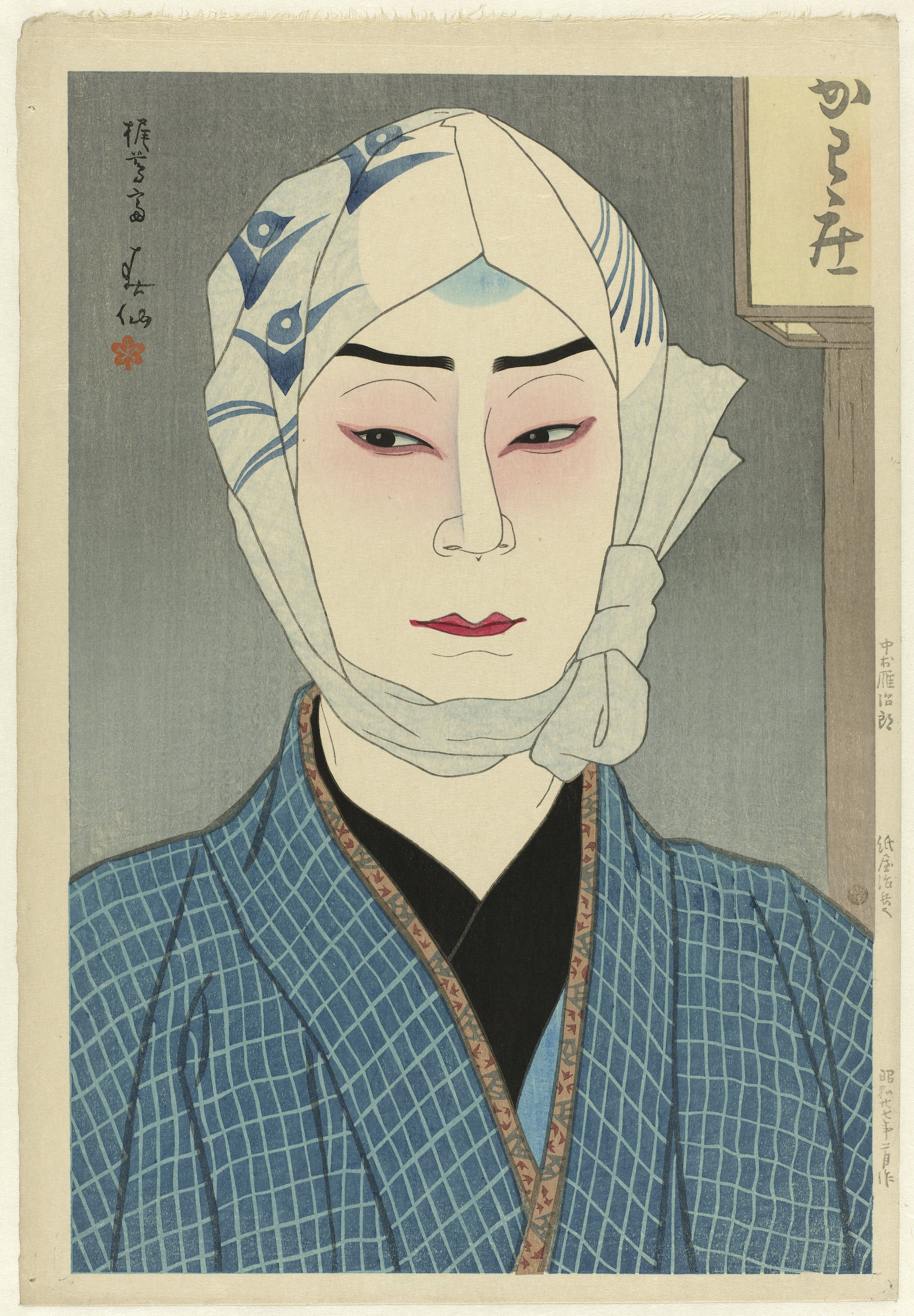
Nakamura Ganjiro II
