= Masamitsu Ota =

Japanese artist (1892–1975)

Masamitsu Ota also known as Ōta Gako (太田 雅光, Ōta Masamitsu; 1892–1975) was a Japanese print-maker. He was one of the masters of the shin hanga movement. His work consisted mostly of kabuki actor prints that emphasized the individual personality of the actors, showcased through rich colours and exquisite patterns of complex design.

Ota had a lifelong involvement with kabuki theater, illustrating volumes on major kabuki plays and famous kabuki costumes. His two most important set of actor prints, Showa Butai Sugata (1950) and Gendai Butai Geika (1955) were published by the Banchoro studio. These sets, of twelve prints each, exhibit a very high level of realism, achieved through the use of western techniques of perspective and through beautiful shading (bokashi) and attention to detail.

== Technique and Style ==
Ota Masamitsu was renowned for an attention to detail: his use of facial expression and hand gesture in particular are key aspects of his technique which signal particular moments in the kabuki play. For example, his piece 'Moritsuna as Ichikawa ebizo IX' is well-known for the 'nauseated grimace' and 'clenched fist' of the actor which represents the play in its dramatic climax.

Masamitsu's use of fine gradations to achieve a three-dimensional impression, the realistic rendering of texture like the actors' clothes, and a sparing but intentional use of mica (glitter) have led to his reputation for technical brilliance
