= Jūmonji =

Jūmonji (十文字) may refer to:

== People ==
- Bishin Jumonji, Japanese photographer
- Chisako Jumonji, Japanese professional wrestler
- Sachiko Jumonji, Japanese professional wrestler
- Jūmonji Tomokazu, Japanese sumo wrestler
- Takanobu Jumonji, Japanese cyclist

== Places ==
- Jūmonji, Akita, a town
- Jūmonji Station, a railway station in Jumonji, Japan
- Jumonji University, Jumonji, Japan

== Popular culture ==
- Jumanji (picture book), a 1981 fantasy children's picture book about an eponymous magical board game
- Jumanji (franchise), a series of movies inspired by the books

== Other uses ==
- Jumonji, an enzyme encoded by the JARID2 gene
- Jumonji C (JmJC) domain-containing demethylases, the largest group of histone demethylases.
- Jūmonji Yari (十文字槍), a cross-shaped spear

== See also ==
- Jumanji, 1995 film
