= Hasui Kawase =

Japanese artist (1883–1957)

- 川瀬 巴水
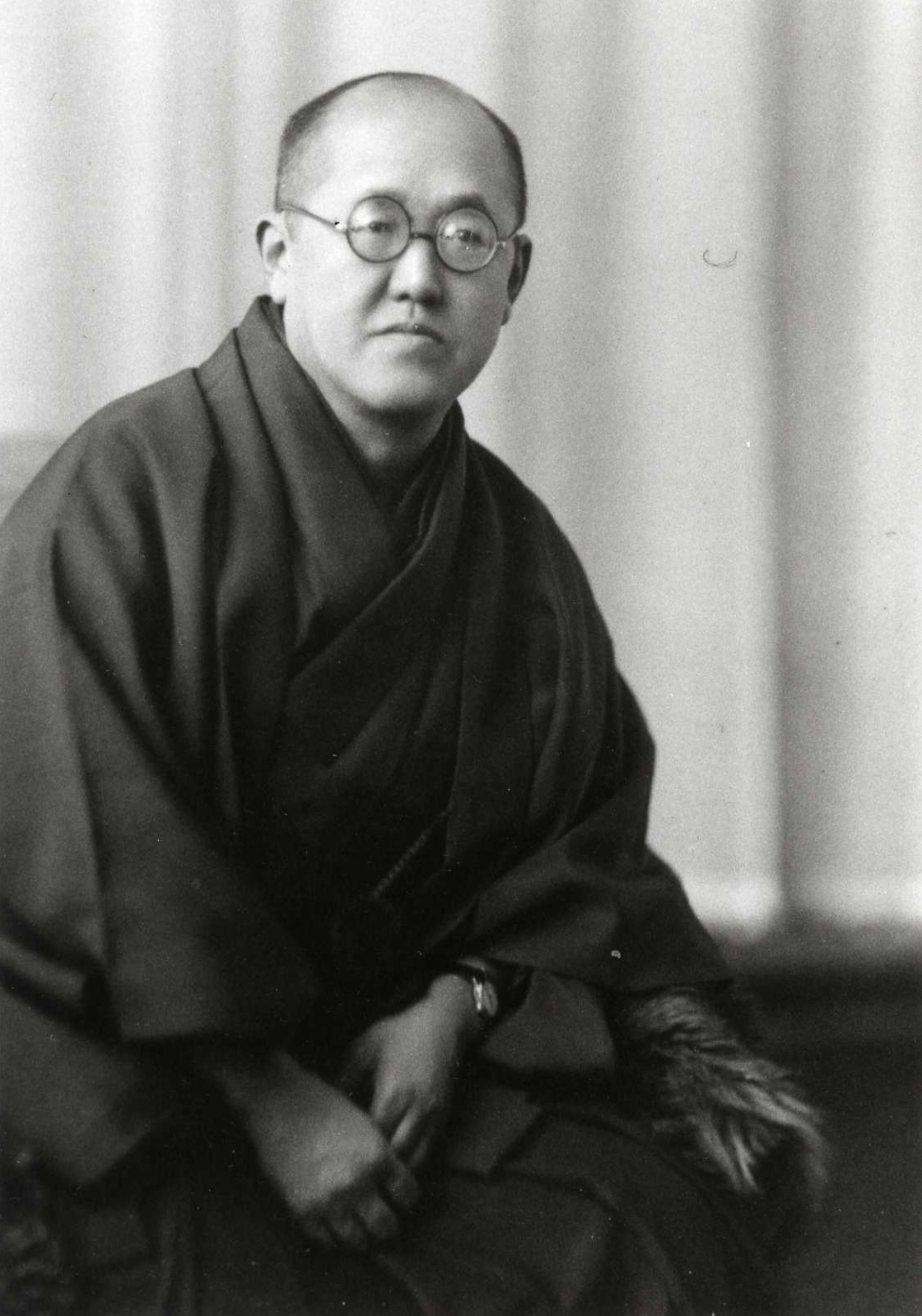
- Portrait of Hasui Kawase, 1939
- Born: May 18, 1883; Minato, Tokyo, Japan
- Died: November 7, 1957 (aged 74)
- Movement: Shin-hanga

Hasui Kawase (川瀬 巴水, Kawase Hasui; May 18, 1883 – November 7, 1957) was a Japanese artist who was one of 20th century Japan's most important and prolific printmakers. He was a prominent designer of the shin-hanga ("new prints") movement, whose artists depicted traditional subjects with a style influenced by yōga (Western-style painting). Like many earlier ukiyo-e prints, Kawase's works were commonly landscapes, but displayed atmospheric effects and natural lighting.

Kawase designed almost one thousand woodblock prints over a career that spanned nearly forty years. Towards the end of his life the government recognized him as a Living National Treasure for his contribution to Japanese culture.

== Life ==
Born Bunjiro Kawase in 1883, as a youth he dreamed of an art career. His paternal uncle was Robun Kanagaki (1829–94), a Japanese author and journalist, who produced the first manga magazine. Kawase went to the school of the painter Bokusen Aoyagi as a young man. He sketched from nature, copied the masters' woodblock prints, and studied brush painting with Kanyu Araki. His parents had him take on the family rope and thread wholesaling business, but its bankruptcy when he was 26 led him to pursue art.

He approached Kiyokata Kaburagi to teach him nihonga (Japanese style painting), but Kaburagi instead encouraged him to study yōga (Western-style painting), which he did with Saburōsuke Okada for two years. Two years later he again applied as a student to Kaburagi, who this time accepted him. Kaburagi bestowed the name Hasui upon him, which can be translated as "water gushing from a spring", and derives from his elementary school combined with an ideogram of his family name. Hasui Kawase became his artist name from that point on.

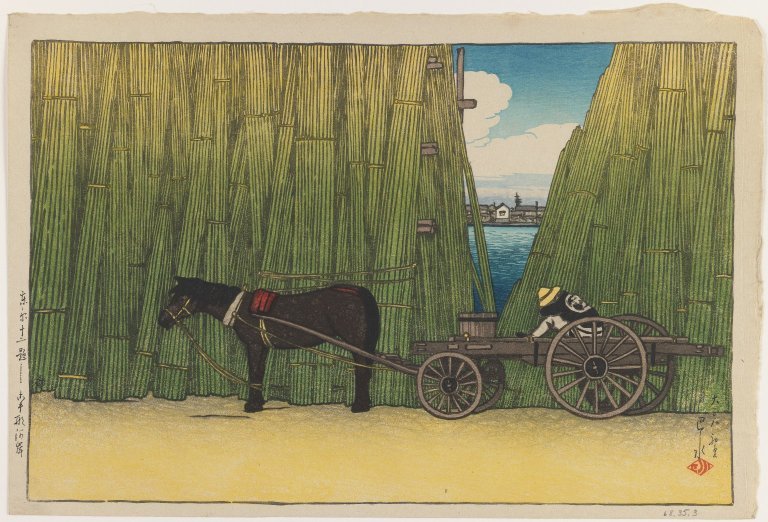
Komagata Embankment, 1920. From series Twelve Scenes of Tokyo.

After seeing an exhibition of Shinsui Itō's Eight Views of Lake Biwa, Kawase approached Ito's publisher Shōzaburō Watanabe, who had him design three experimental prints that Watanabe published in August 1918. The series Twelve Scenes of Tokyo, Eight Views of the Southeast, and the first Souvenirs of Travel of 16 prints followed in 1919, each issued two prints at a time.

Kawase's twelve-print A Collection of Scenes of Japan begun in 1922 went unfinished when the 1923 Great Kantō earthquake destroyed Watanabe's workshop, including the finished woodblocks for the yet-undistributed prints and Kawase's sketchbooks. He lost 188 sketchbooks in which he had drawn landscapes and other subjects.

He travelled the Hokuriku, San'in, and San'yō regions later in 1923 and upon his return in February 1924 developed his sketches into his third Souvenirs of Travel series. His sketching trip at this time lasted 102 days, the longest trip of his life. Many of the sketches he made on this trip became the basis for many of his later works. After this trip, the vividness of his colors and the realism of his work increased, and he gained further fame.

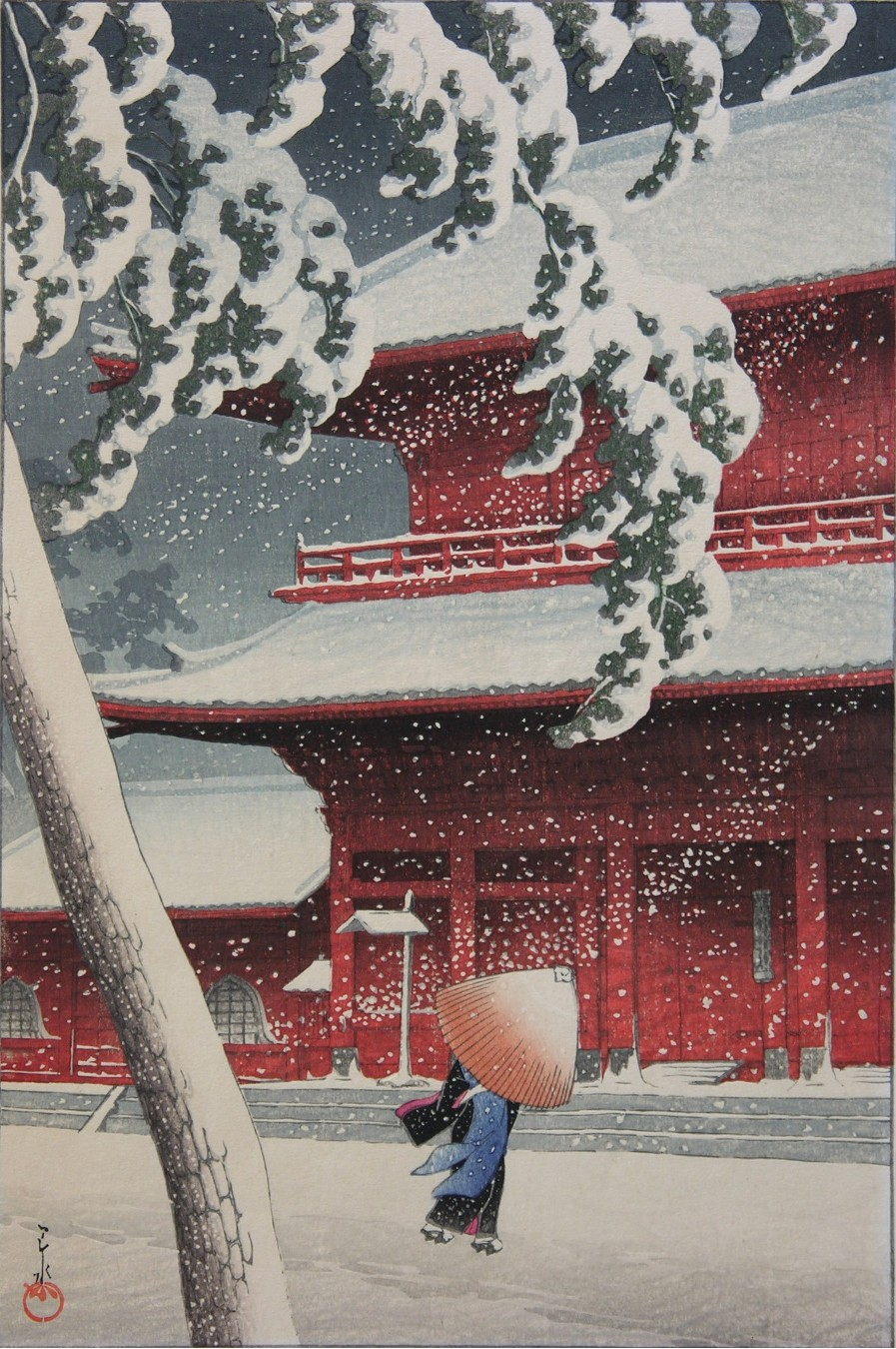
Zōjō-ji in Shiba, 1925. From series Twenty Views of Tōkyō.

From the series Twenty Views of Tōkyō, Zōjō-ji Temple in Shiba, published in 1925, became Hasui's best-selling work and many printmakers began to imitate his style.

Kawase built a new house in Magome in 1930, and Moon at Magome from the series Twenty Views of Tōkyō sold that year became his second best-selling work.

Kawase studied ukiyo-e and Japanese style painting at the studio of Kiyokata Kaburagi. He mainly concentrated on making watercolors of actors, everyday life and landscapes, many of them published as illustrations in books and magazines in the last few years of the Meiji period and early Taishō period.

During the forty years of his artistic career, Kawase worked closely with Shōzaburō Watanabe, publisher and advocate of the shin-hanga movement. His works became widely known in the West through American connoisseur Robert O. Muller (1911–2003). Landscape prints were the most popular of the shin-hanga, and their reputation in the United States reached its peak in the mid-1930s, when Kawase was considered the leading landscape printmaker.

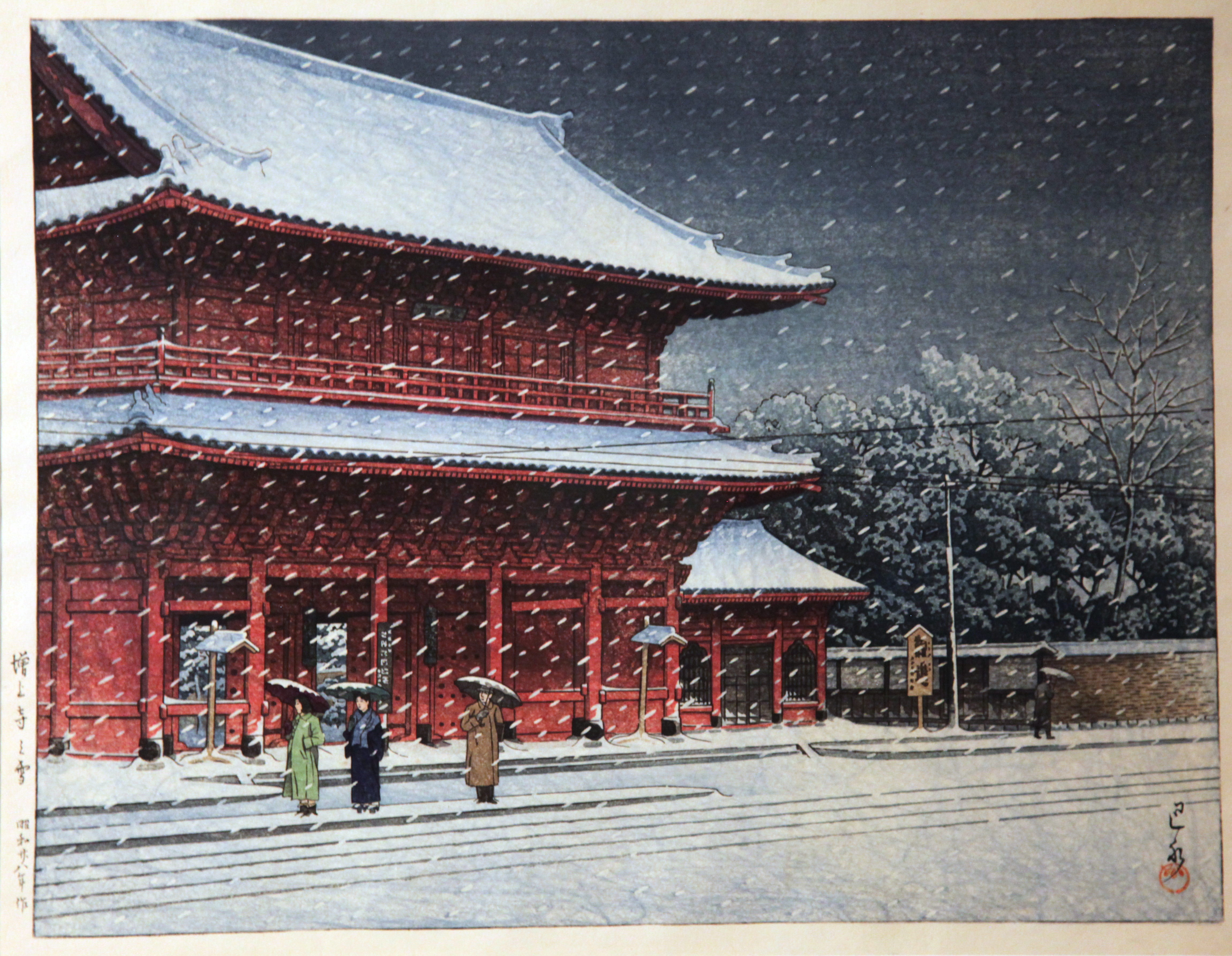
Snow at Zōjō-ji, 1953

In 1956, he was named a Japanese Living National Treasure. The government Committee for the Preservation of Intangible Cultural Treasures had intended to honor traditional printmaking via awards to Kawase and Shinsui Ito in 1953. Because the artists' work necessitated collaboration between designer, engraver, and printer, objections were raised over singling out individual participants for recognition. Therefore, they commissioned the artists to make new prints, the production of which was carefully documented. Kawase's biographer, Munishige Narazaki, was one of those who recorded the process. Thus, Snow at Zōjō-ji was completed in 1953, and the process of printing 42 times was recorded for posterity.

Kawase died on November 27, 1957. He had created around 620 prints over the course of his career. In 1979 Narazaki published a biography and compiled the first catalogue raisonné. An exhibition of 180 of his prints was held in Tokyo in 1982. The catalogue was entitled: "Hasui Kawase: The End of the Line For Ukiyo-e".

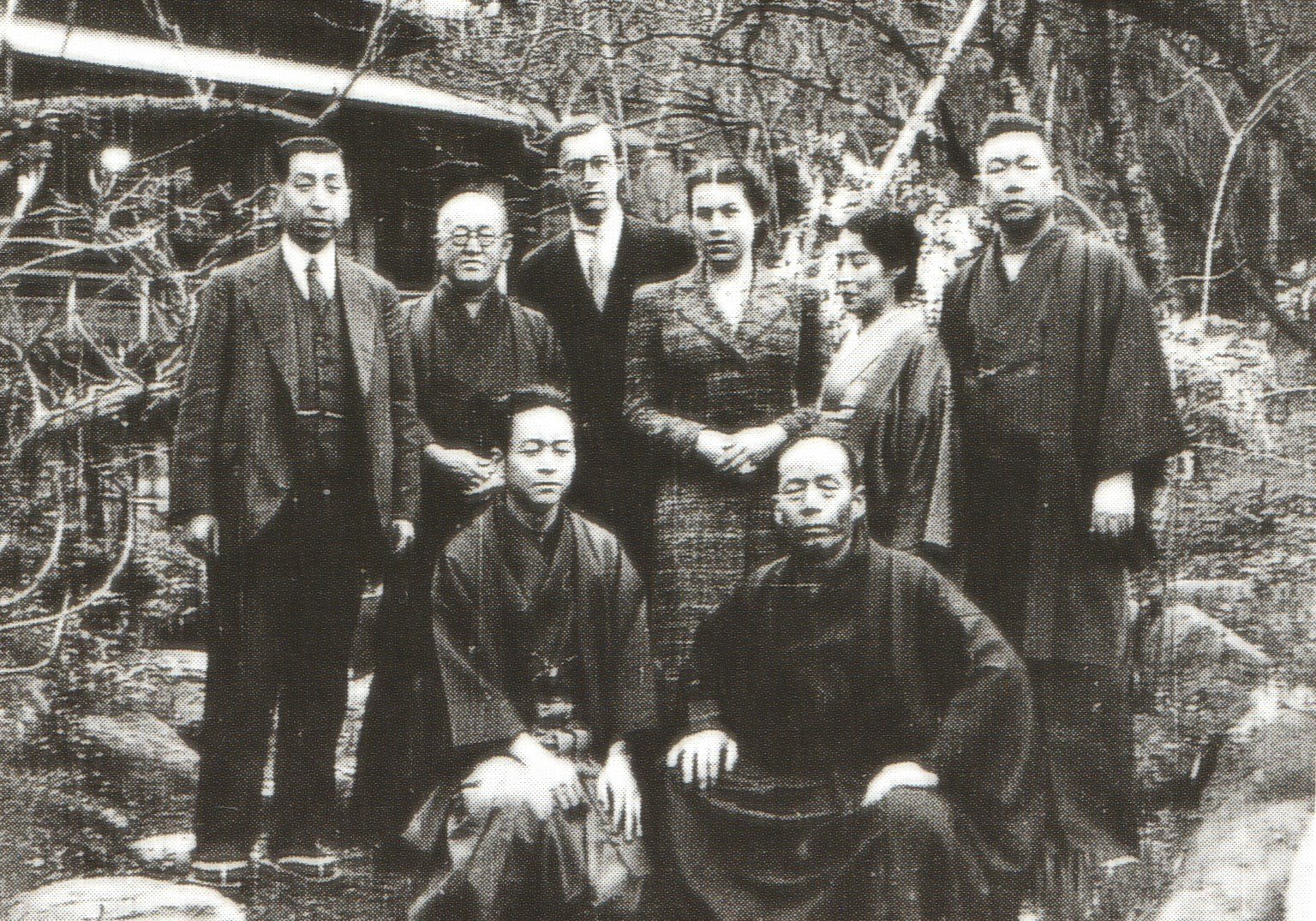
In the garden of artist Shinsui Itō’s Tokyo home. Left to right, back row: Tesutaro Moriyama (assistant to publisher Watanabe); Hasui Kawase, collector Robert O. Muller, Inge Muller, Yoshiko Itō and Shinsui Itō. Left to right, front row: Shirō Kasamatsu and publisher Shōzaburō Watanabe, April 1940

== Style ==
Kawase worked almost exclusively on landscape and townscape prints based on sketches and watercolors he made in Tokyo and during travels around Japan. However, his prints are not merely meisho (famous places) prints that are typical of earlier ukiyo-e masters such as Utagawa Hiroshige and Katsushika Hokusai (1760-1849). Kawase's prints feature locales that are tranquil and obscure in urbanizing Japan.

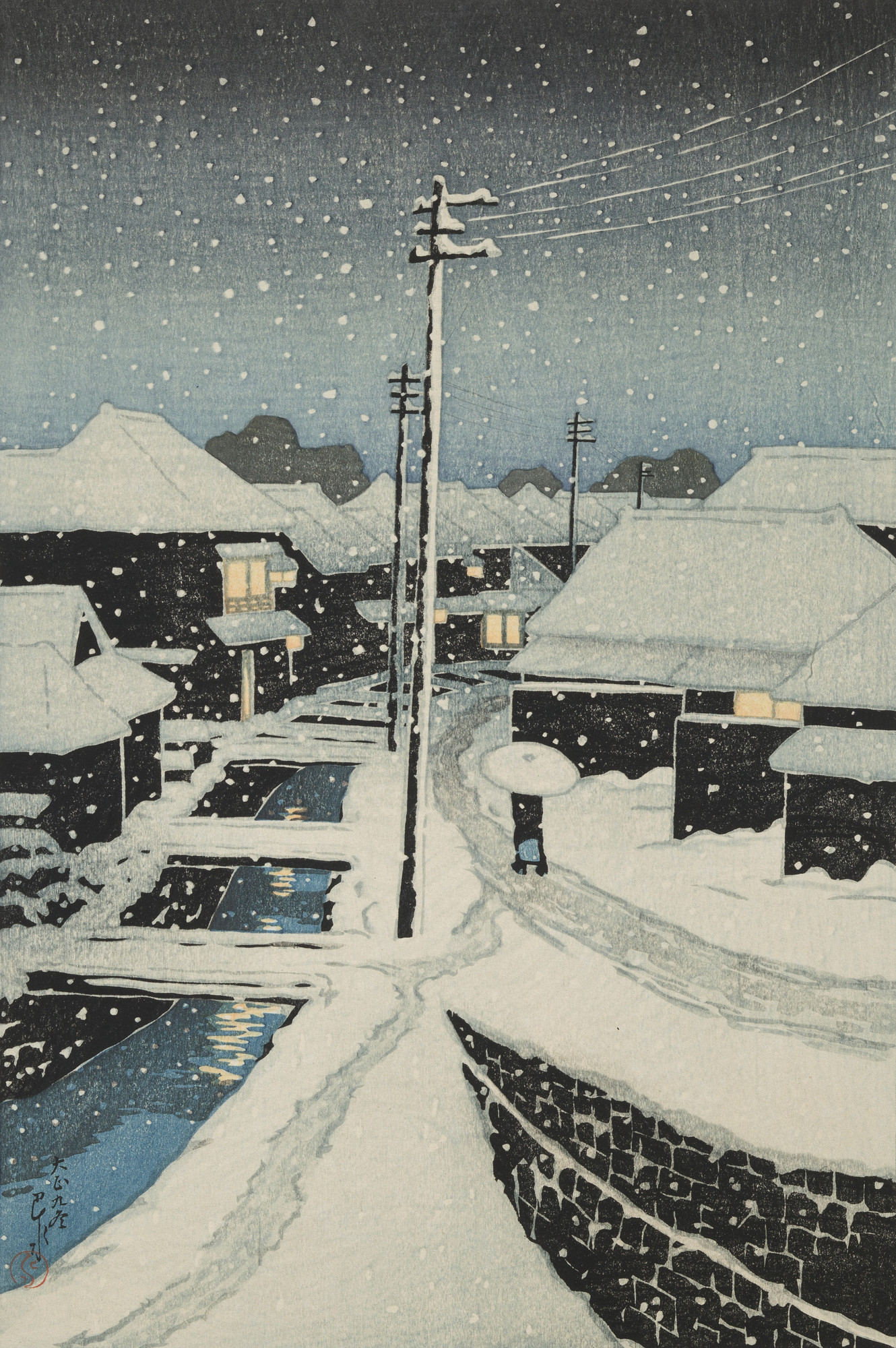
Evening Snow at Terashima Village, 1920. From series Twelve Scenes of Tokyo

In 1920, Kawase designed his first falling snow print. His snow scenes are among the most original and best of his works. He later recalled "In my earlier works there are novel expressions in carving line and forms: the artisans used to complain." He said of the relationship between designer and printer:

In the case of printing we must interact very closely. A less experienced printer might waste seven or eight trial prints before a successful one is made. If someone is experienced we can decide on the final print after two or three trials. It occurs occasionally that despite best efforts, a successful print is still not produced. This is the hard part of composite art. It requires telepathic communication. Unless all parties are completely in tune, the process will not work. When my mind and the minds of the artisans are in complete agreement, a good work can be generated.

Kawase considered himself a realist and employed his training in yōga in his compositions. Like Hiroshige he made travel and landscape prints, though his subjects were less known locations rendered with naturalistic light, shade, and texture, without the captions and titles that were standard in prints of Hiroshige's age.

Kawase left a large body of woodblock prints and watercolors: many of the watercolors are linked to the woodblock prints. He also produced oil paintings, traditional hanging scrolls and a few byōbu (folding screens).

== Gallery ==
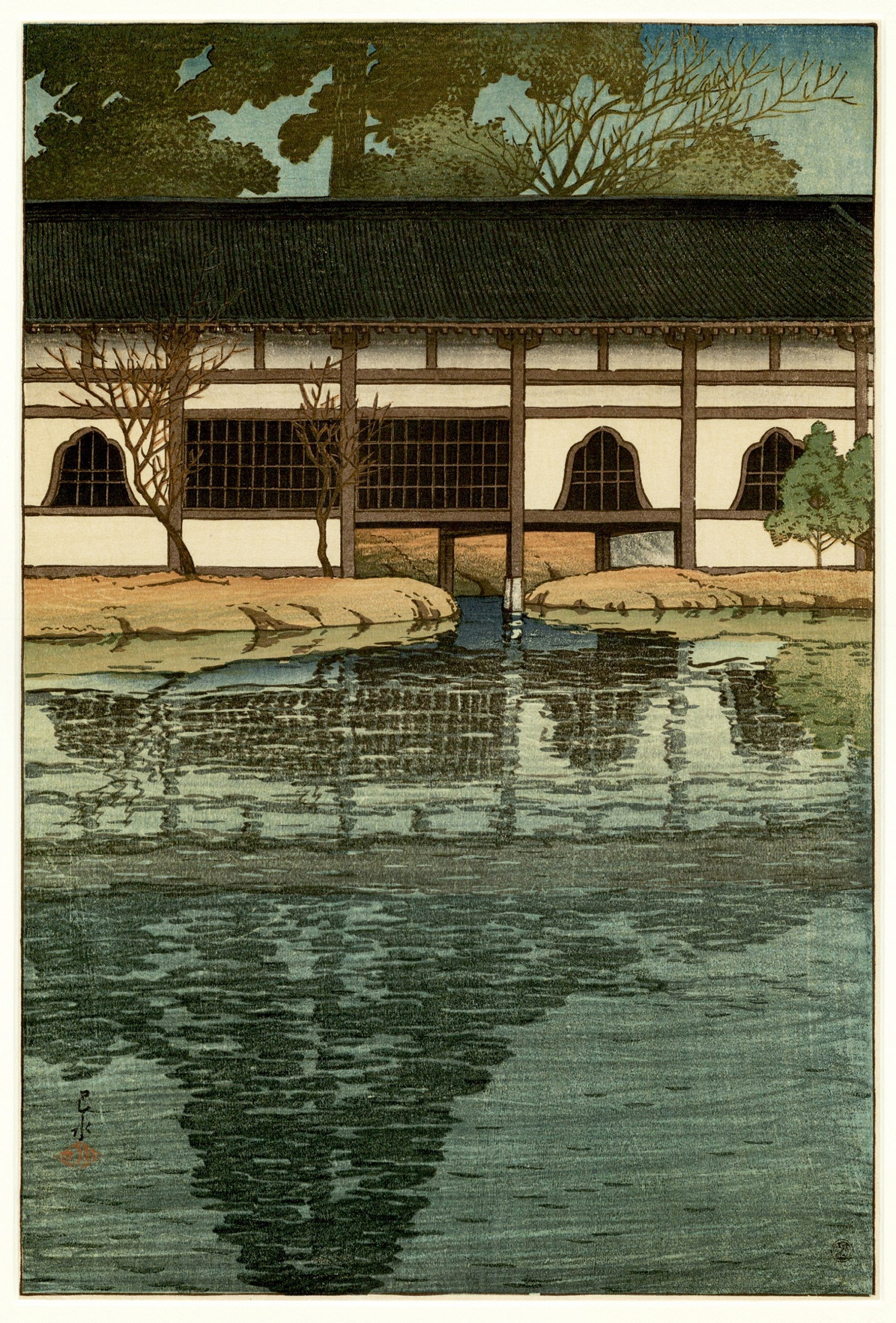
Part of the Byōdō-in Temple at Uji, 1921

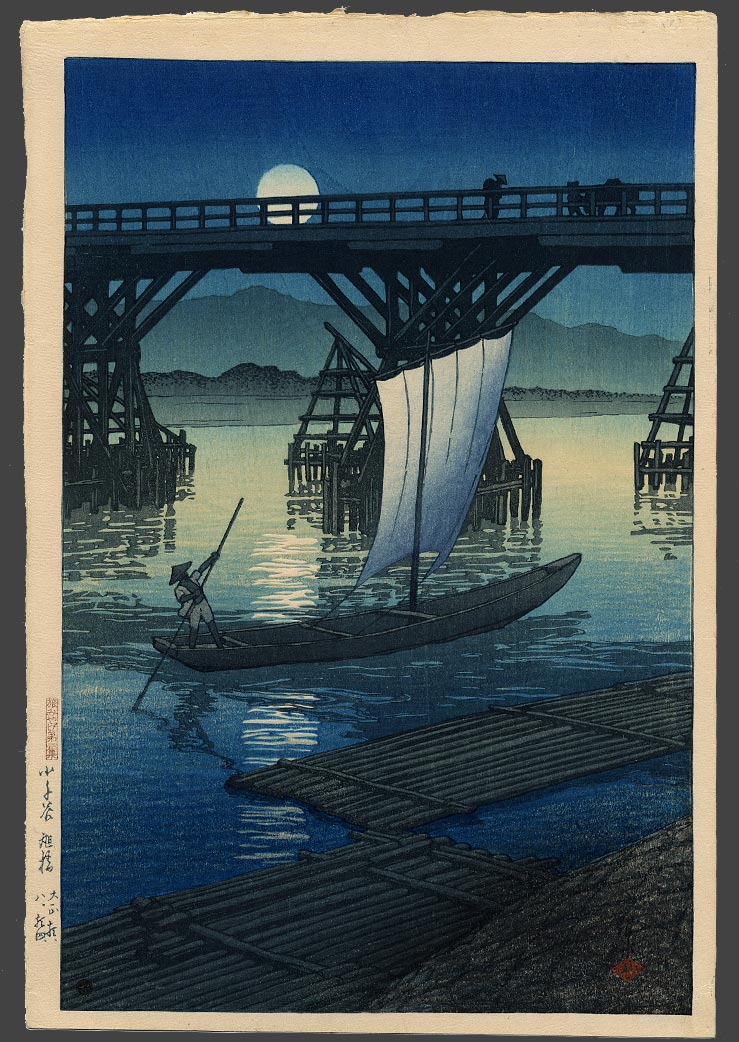
Asahi Bridge in Ojiya, 1921

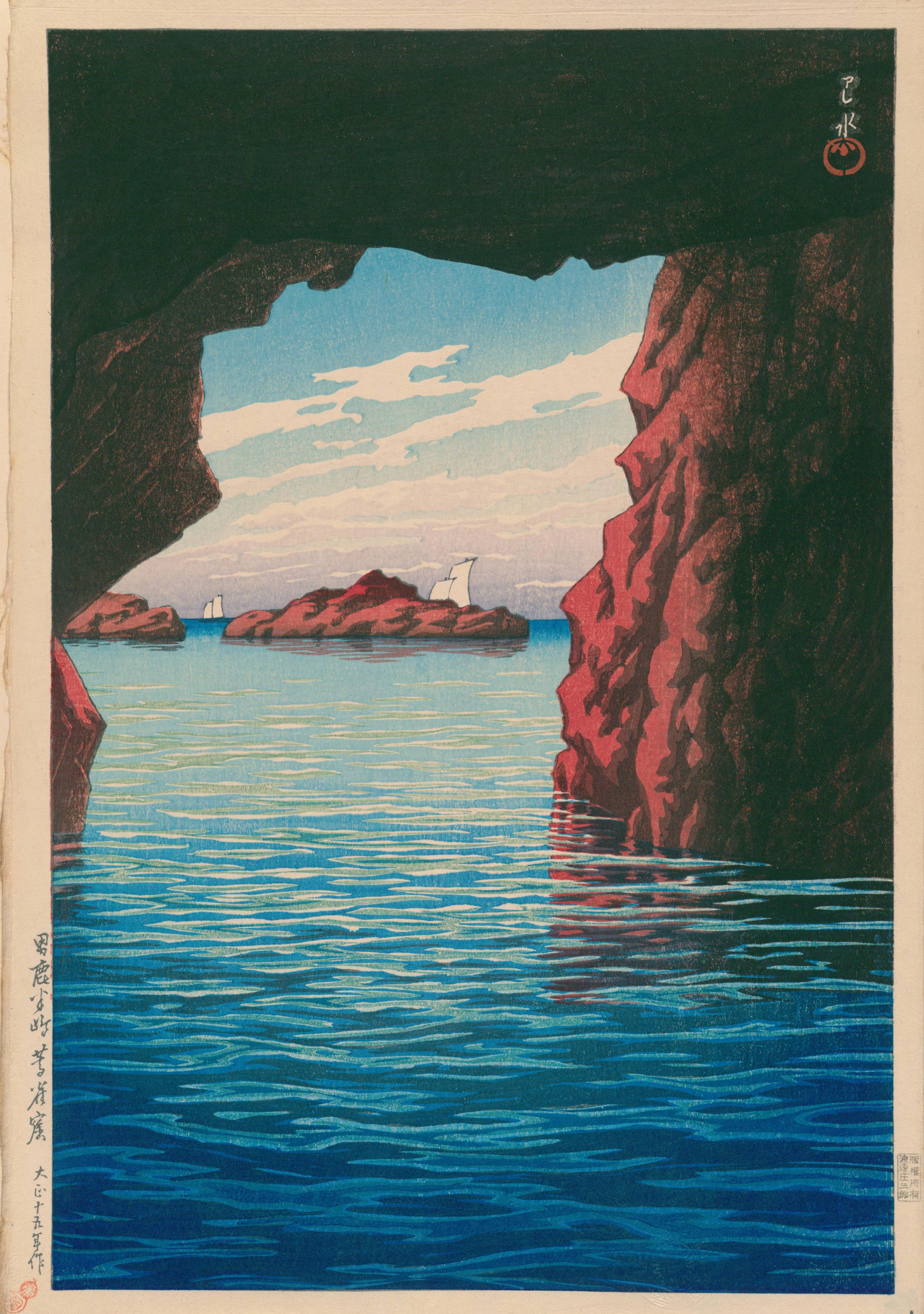
Kojaku Cavern, Oga Peninsula, 1926

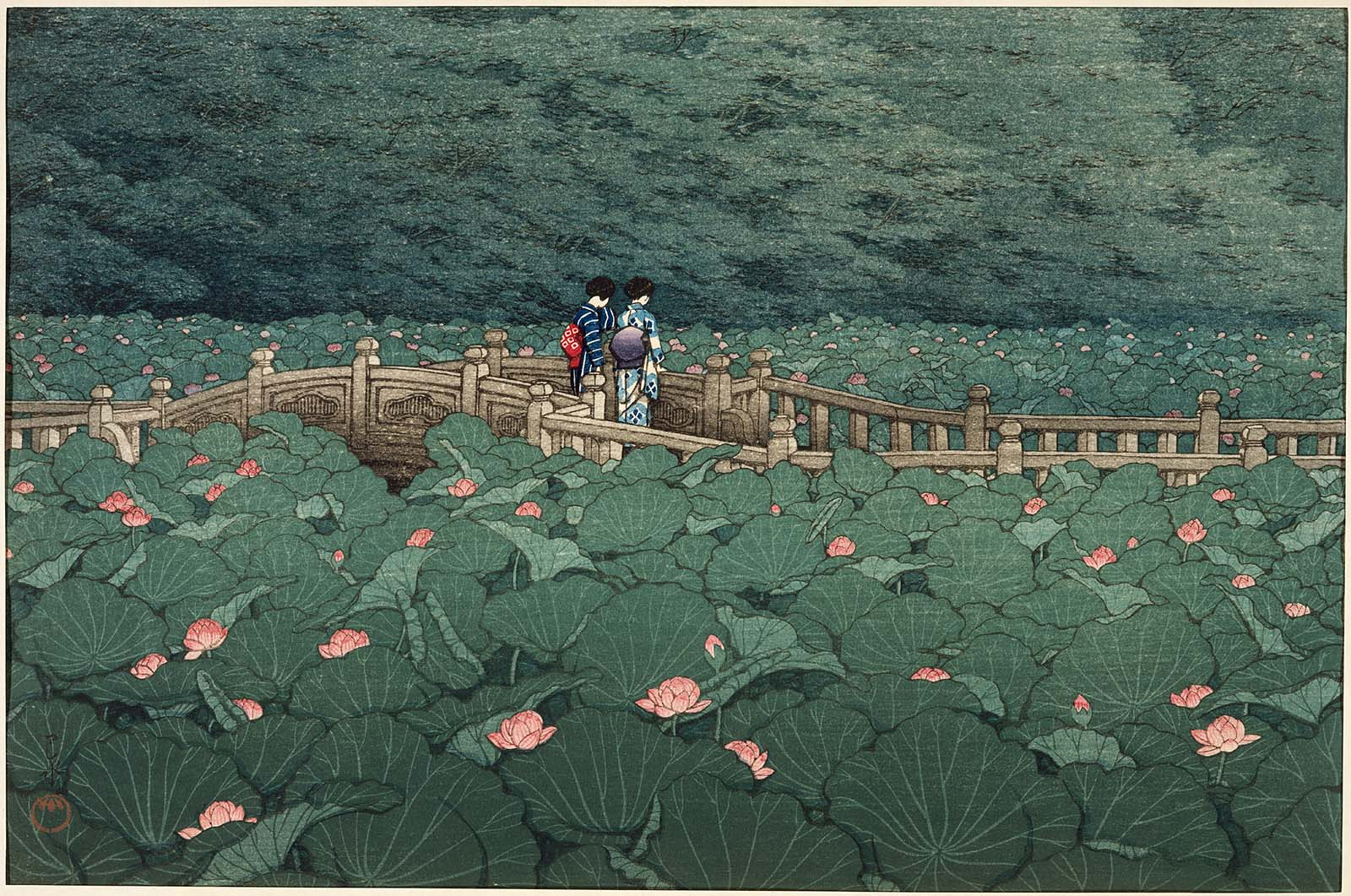
Pond at Benten Shrine in Shiba, 1929

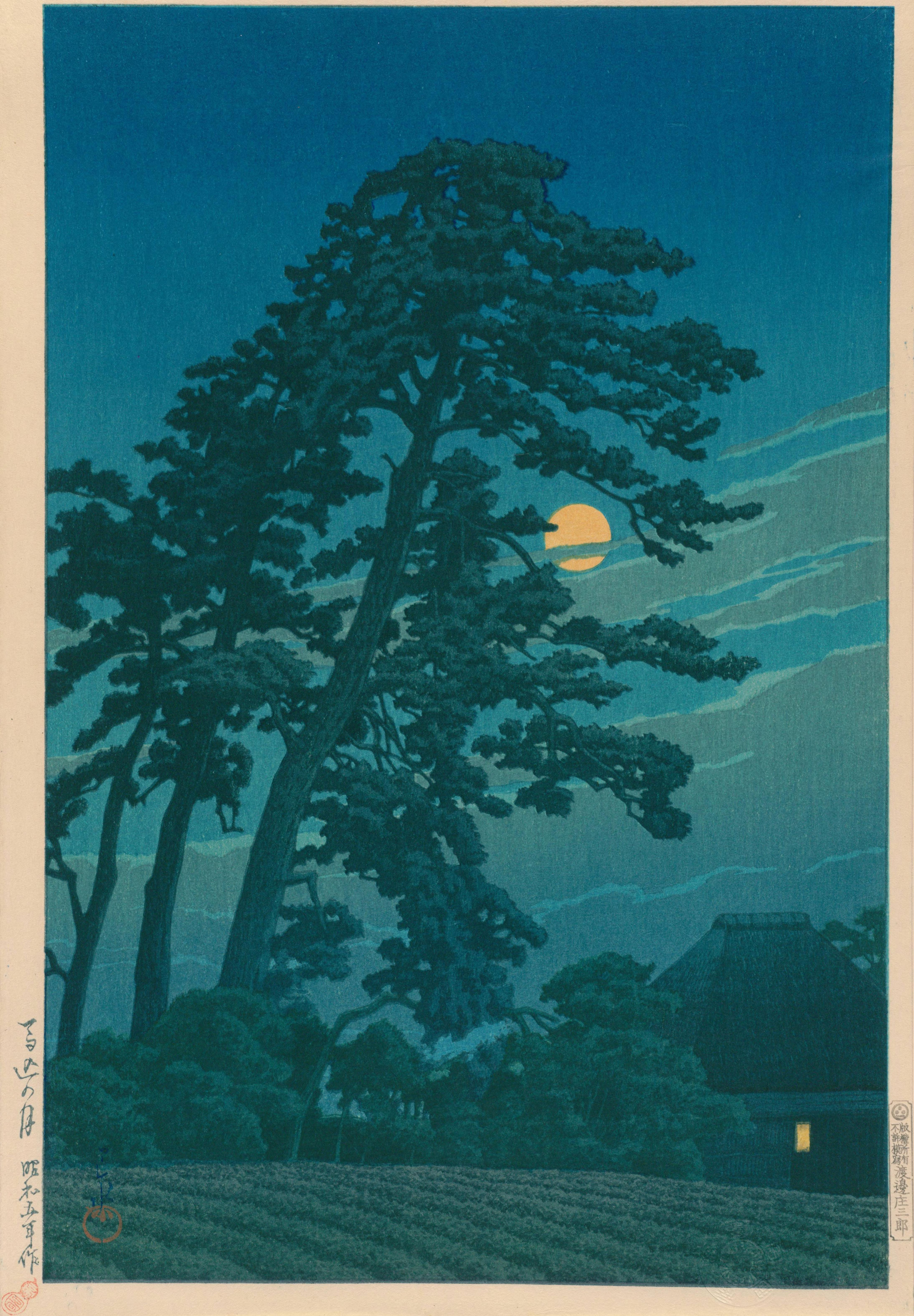
Moon at Magome, 1930

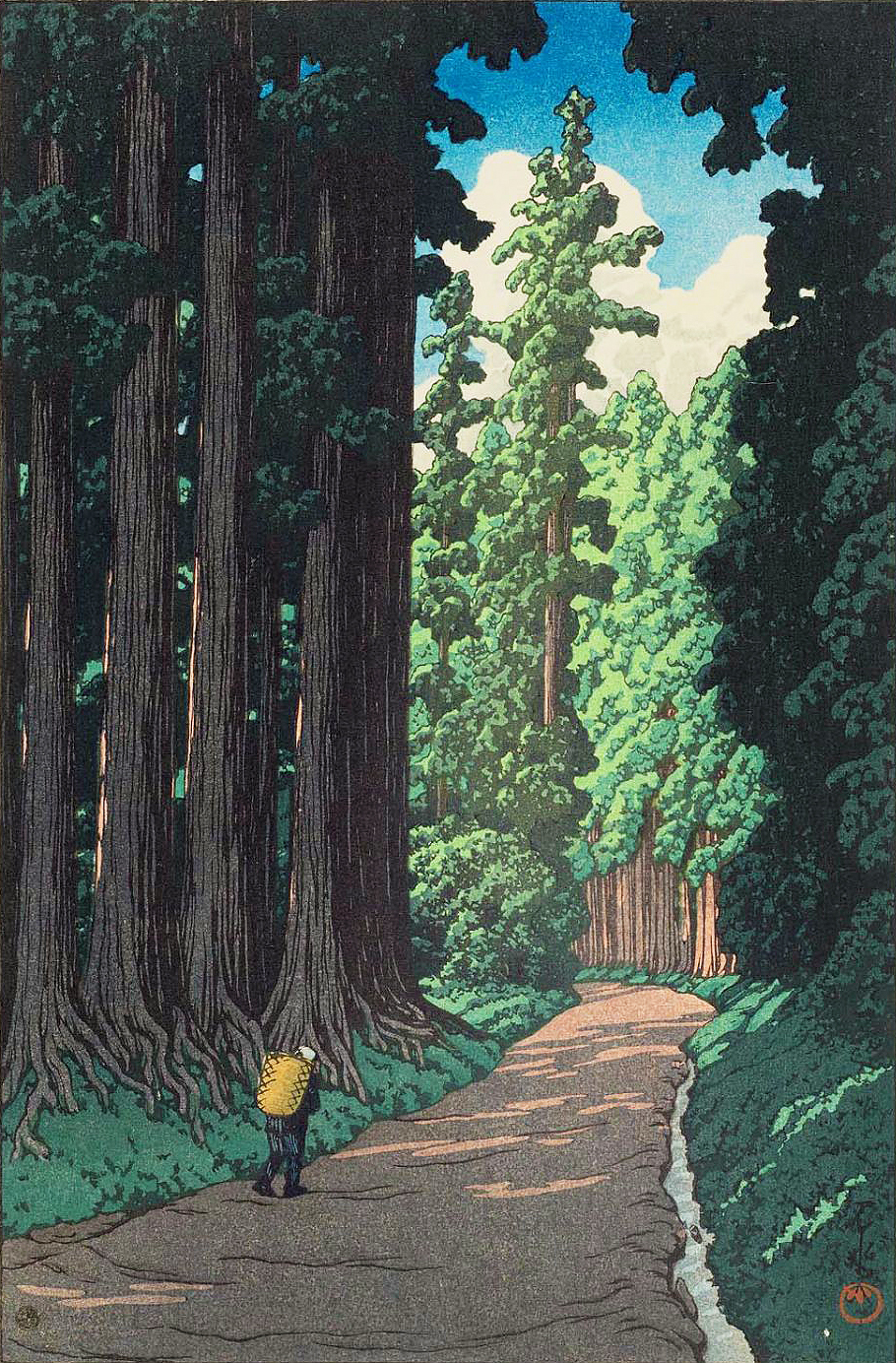
Nikkō Kaidō, 1930

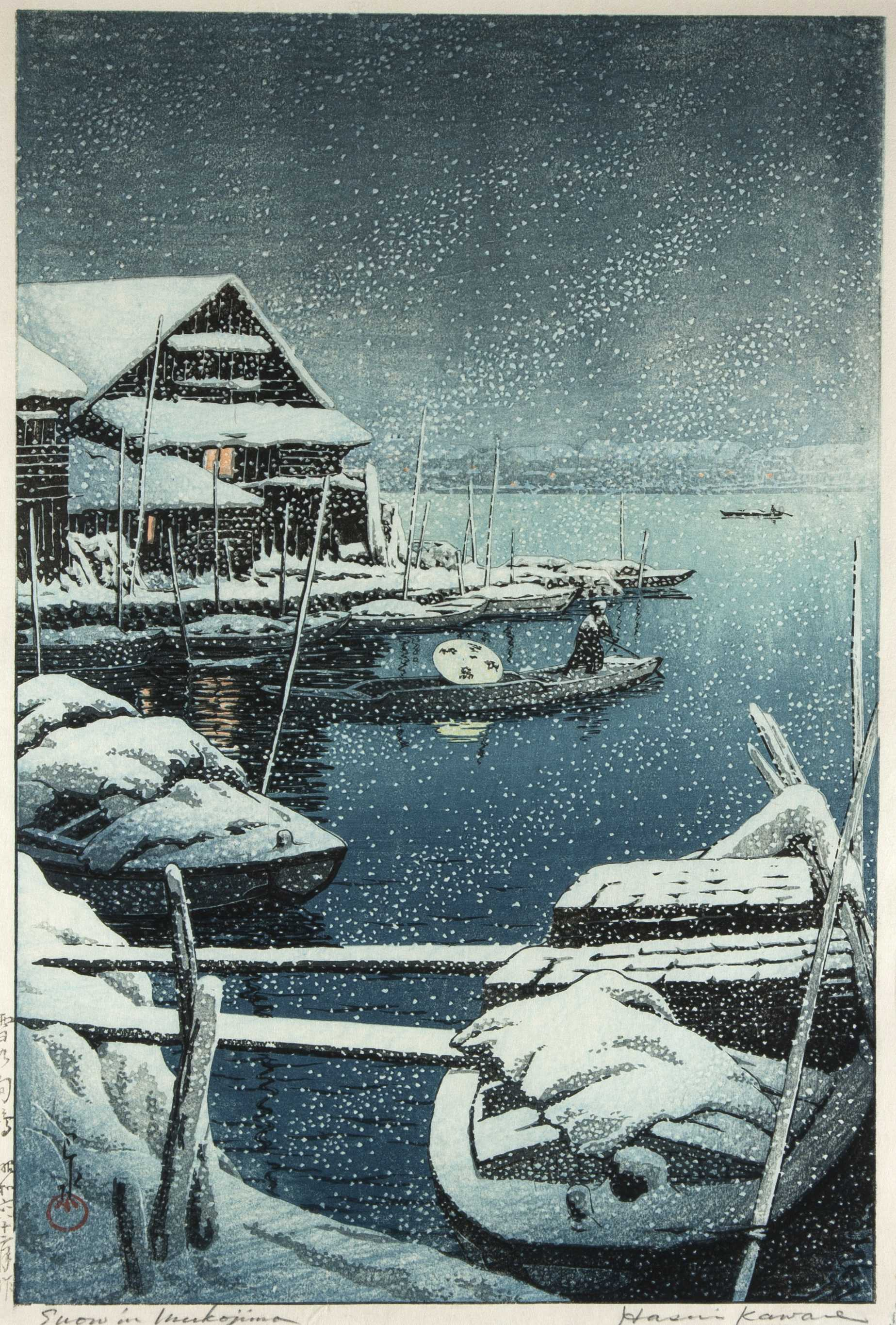
Snow in Mukojima, 1931

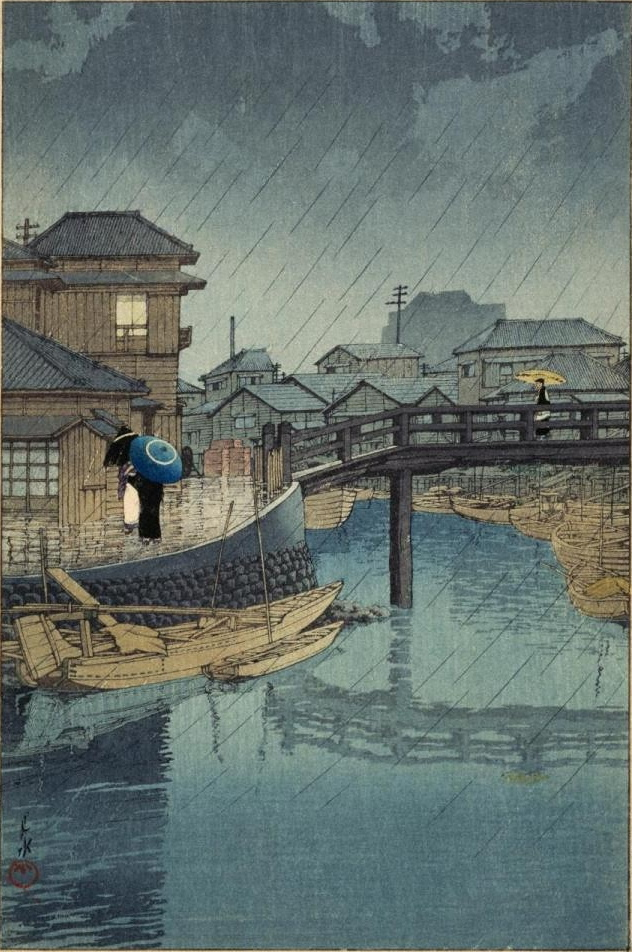
Shinagawa, 1931

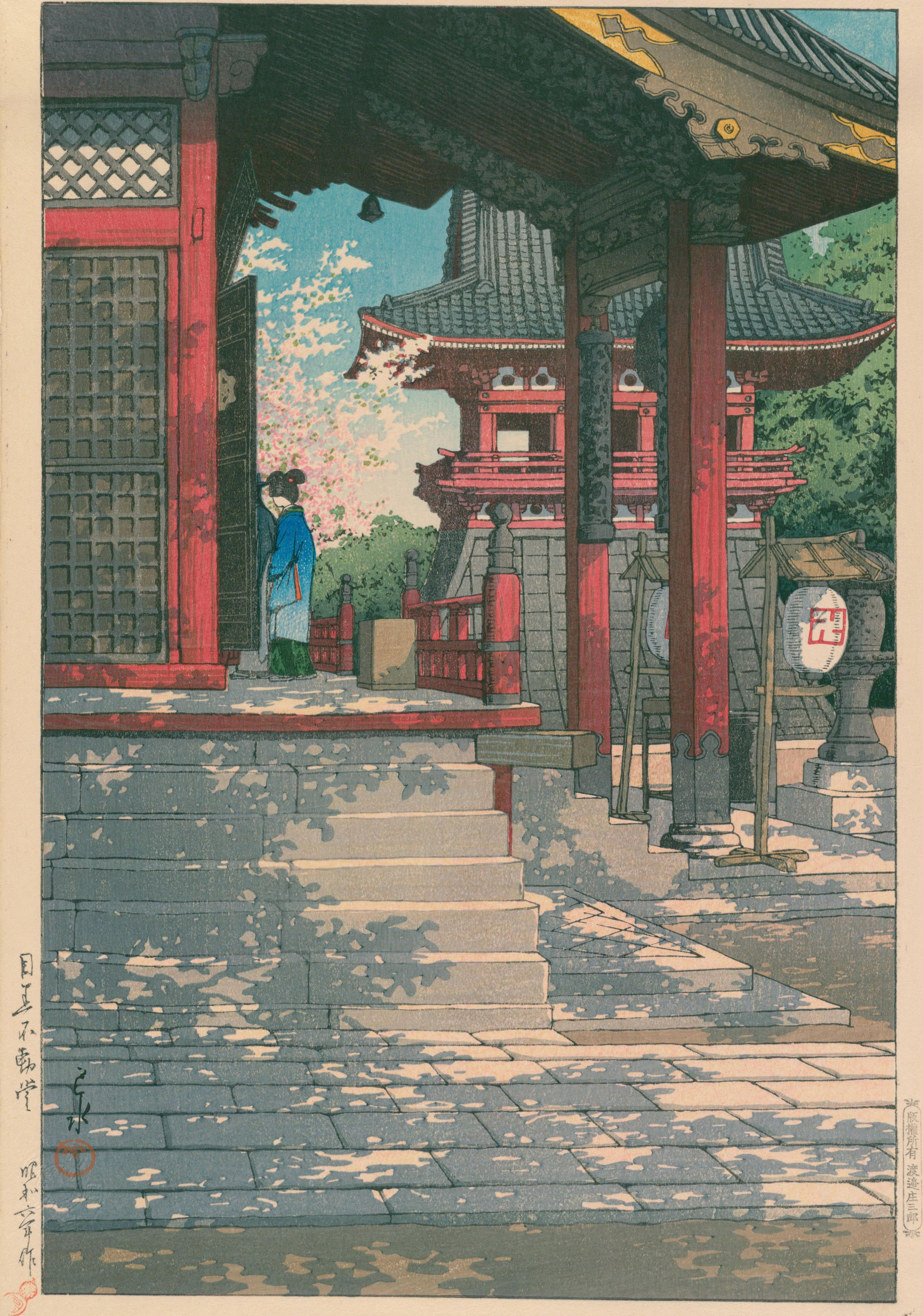
Meguro Fudō Temple, 1931/1935

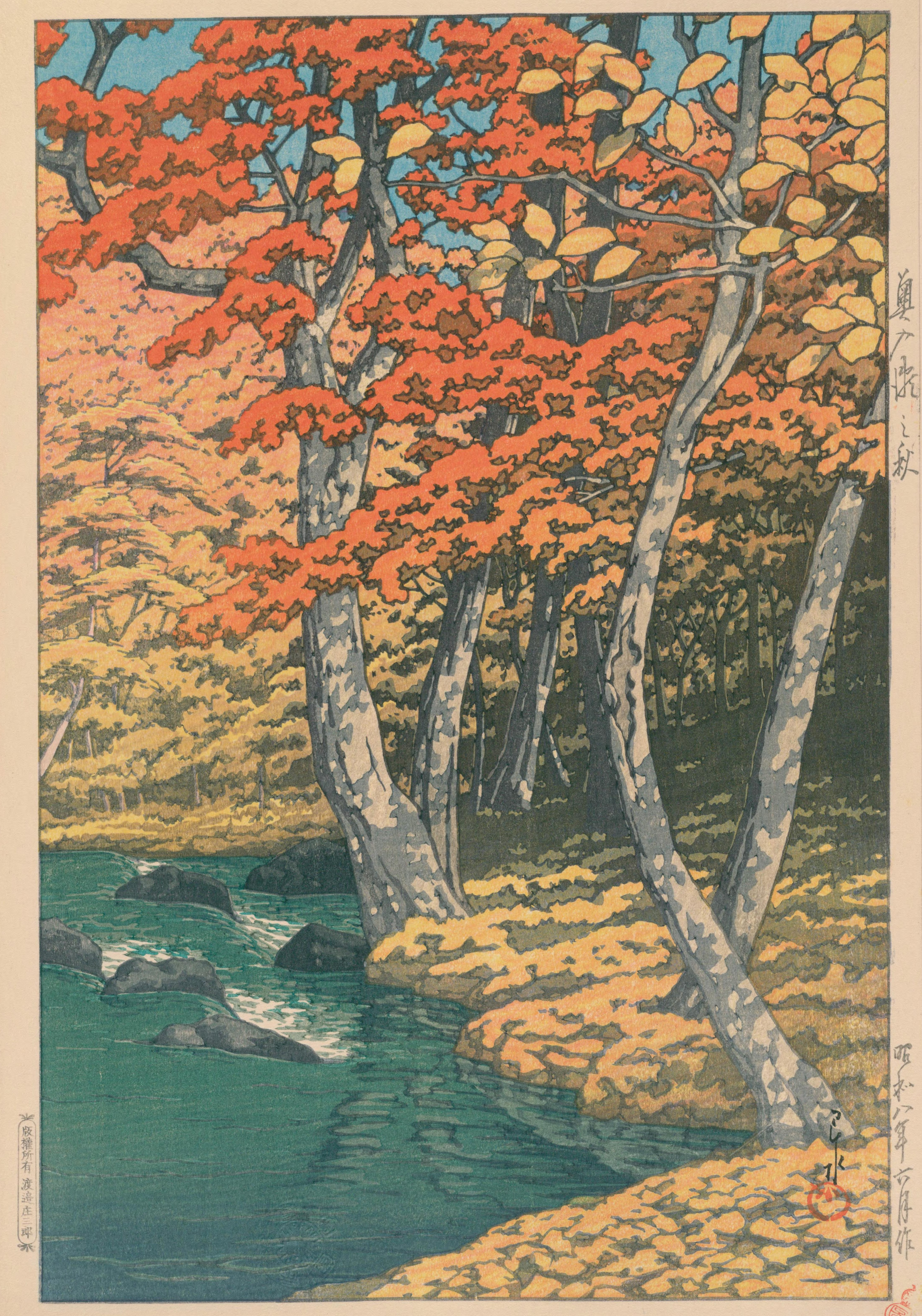
Autumn at Oirase, 1933/1935

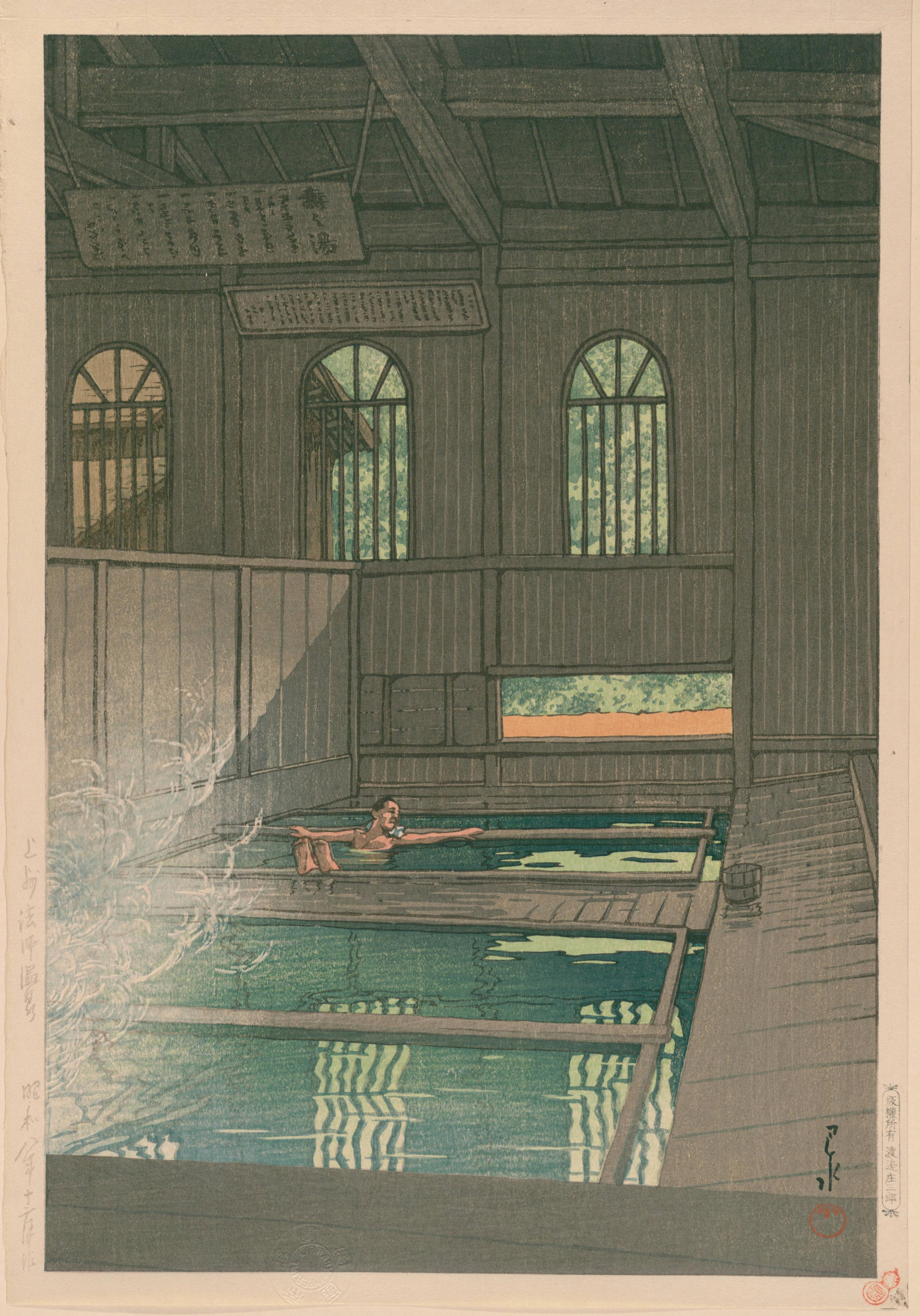
Hoshi Hot Spring in Jōshū, 1933/1935

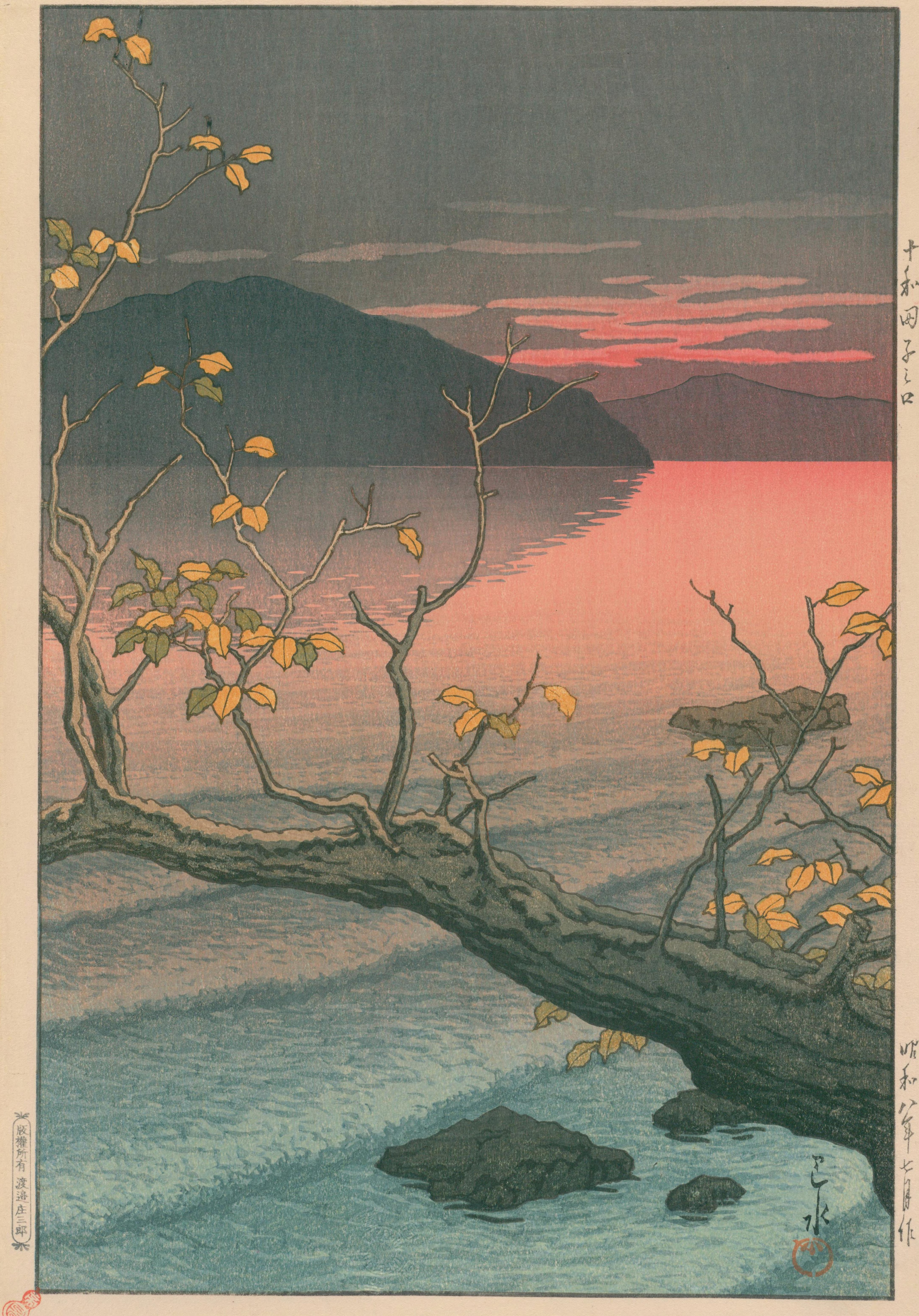
Nenokuchi Lake Towada, 1933/1935

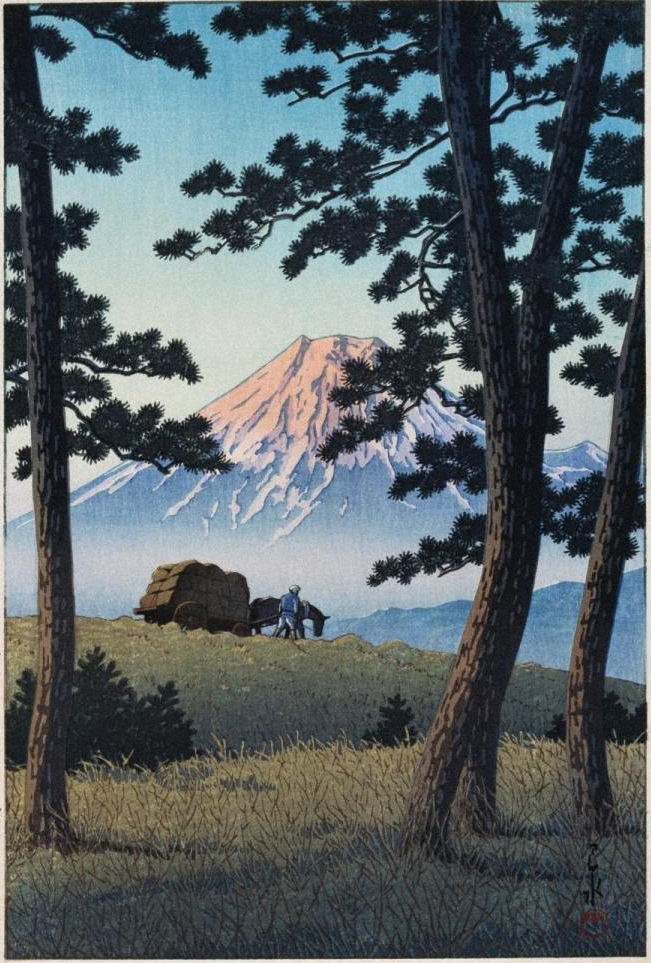
Evening at Tagonoura, 1940

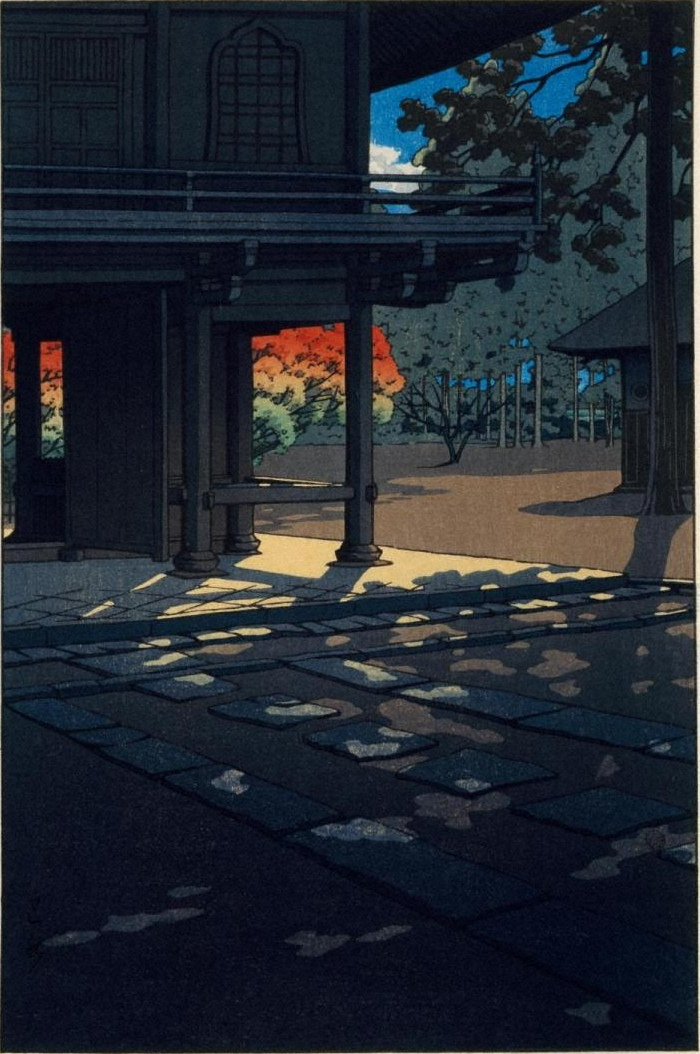
Heirin-ji, Nobidome, 1952

== Important series and works ==
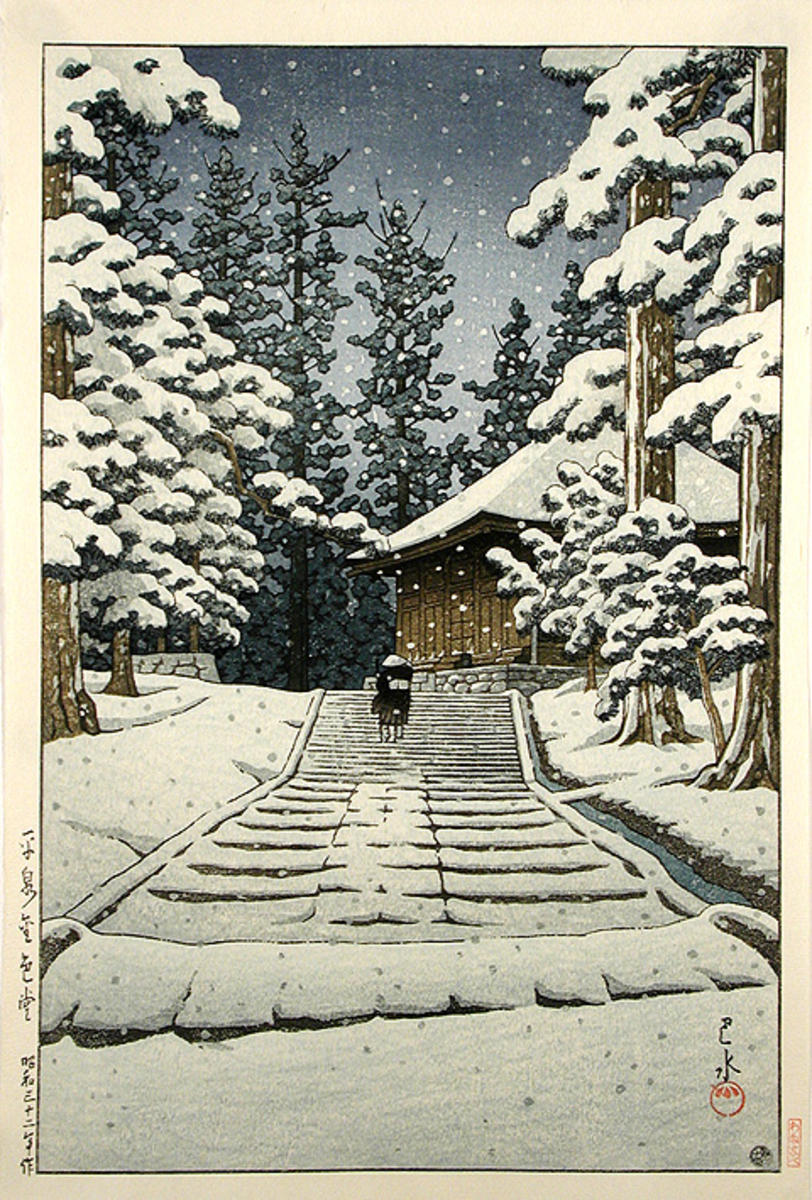
Hasui's final work, Hall of the Golden Hue, Hiraizumi, 1957

- Twelve Scenes of Tokyo (1919–1921)
- Souvenirs of Travel, Vol. I (1919–1920) Vol. II (1921) Vol. III (1924–1929)
- The Mitsubishi Villa in Fukagawa (1920)
- Selected Views of Japan (1922–1926)
- Twenty Views of Tokyo (1925–1930)
- New Eight Views of Japan (1927)
- Selected Views of the Tokaido Road (1931–1947)
- Collected Views of Japan, Eastern Japan (1932–1936)
- Collected Views of Japan II, Kansai (1933–1943)
- Collected Views of Kennan Mountain Villa in Moto-Hakone (1935)
- One-hundred Views of New Tokyo (1936)
- Shinto and Its Architecture (1936)
- Eight Views of Korea (1939)
- Pacific Transport Lines (1952)
- Snow at Zōjō-ji (1953)
- Hall of the Golden Hue, Hiraizumi (1957; Kawase's final work)

About dating of the prints: Many of them are reprinted 1960 after Kawase's death. (In Japan, it is unusual to number the prints, e.g. "5th of 100".)

== Works in museums ==
Hasui Kawase's works are currently kept in several museums worldwide, including the British Museum, the Toledo Museum of Art, the Brooklyn Museum, the Indianapolis Museum of Art, the Museum of Fine Arts, Boston, the Metropolitan Museum of Art, the Portland Art Museum, the Los Angeles County Museum of Art, the University of Michigan Museum of Art, the Minneapolis Institute of Art, the Stanley Museum of Art, the Walters Art Museum, the Clark Art Institute, the Smart Museum of Art, the Nelson-Atkins Museum of Art, and the Virginia Museum of Fine Arts.

== Works cited ==
- Merritt, Helen (1990). Modern Japanese Woodblock Prints: The Early Years. University of Hawaii. ISBN 978-0824812003.
- Patcher, Irwin J. (1986). Kawase Hasui and His Contemporaries: The Shin Hanga (New Print) Movement in Landscape Art. Everson Museum of Art, Syracuse. ISBN 9780914407058.
