= Niiza =

Niiza 新座市
- City
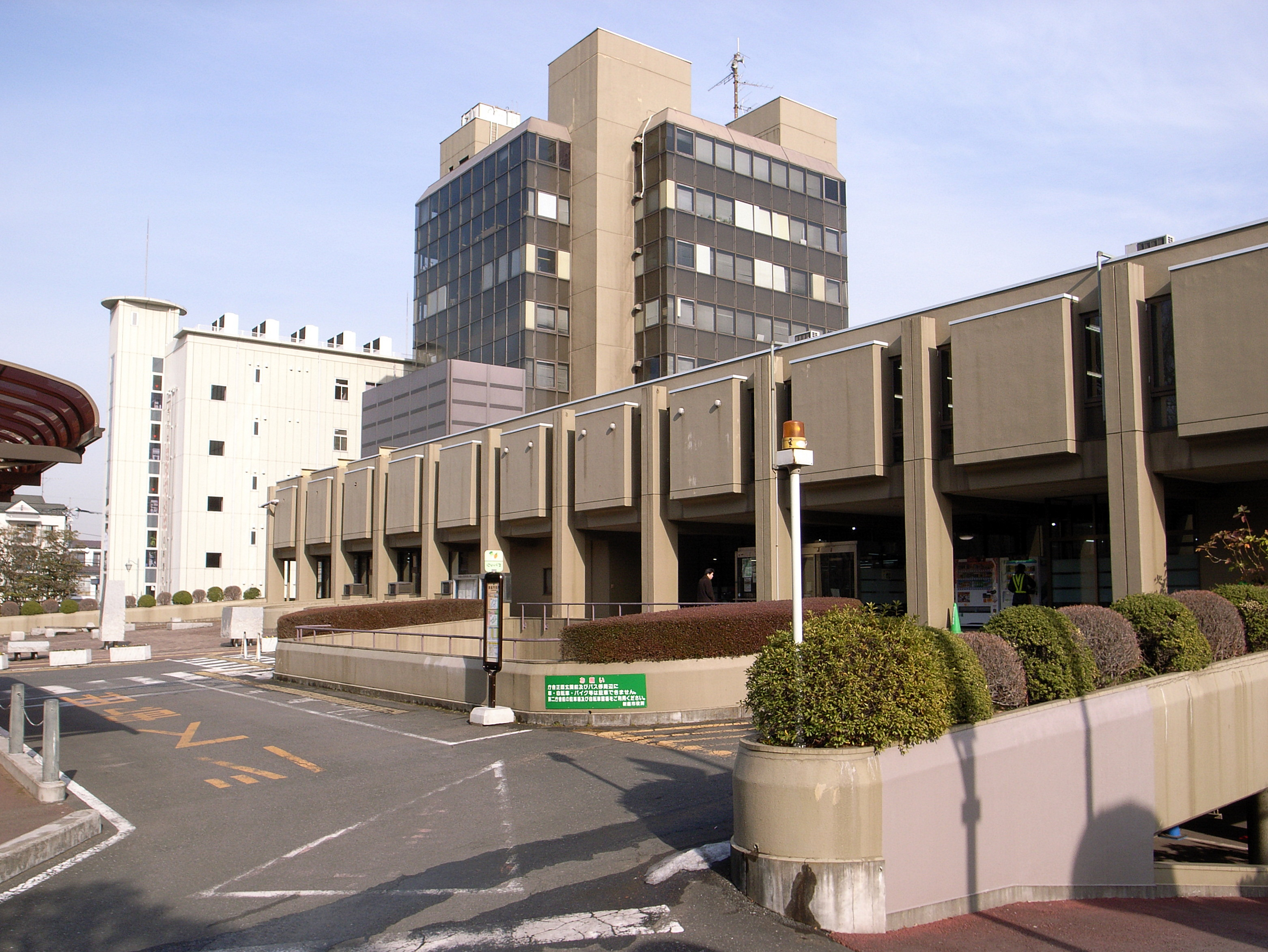
- Niiza City Hall

- Flag Emblem

- Location of Niiza in Saitama Prefecture

- Location within Japan
- Coordinates: 35°47′36.6″N 139°33′55.1″E
- Country: Japan
- Region: Kantō
- Prefecture: Saitama
- Town settled: March 1, 1955
- City settled: November 1, 1970

Government
  - Mayor: Masaru Namiki (from July 2016)

Area
  - Total: 22.78 km^{2} (8.80 sq mi)

Population (January 1, 2021)
  - Total: 166,208
  - Density: 7,296/km^{2} (18,900/sq mi)
- Time zone: UTC+9 (Japan Standard Time)
  - Tree: Acer palmatum
  - Flower: magnolia kobus
- Phone number: 048-477-1111
- Address: 1-1-1 Nobitome, Niiza-shi, Saitama-ken 352-8623
- Website: Official website

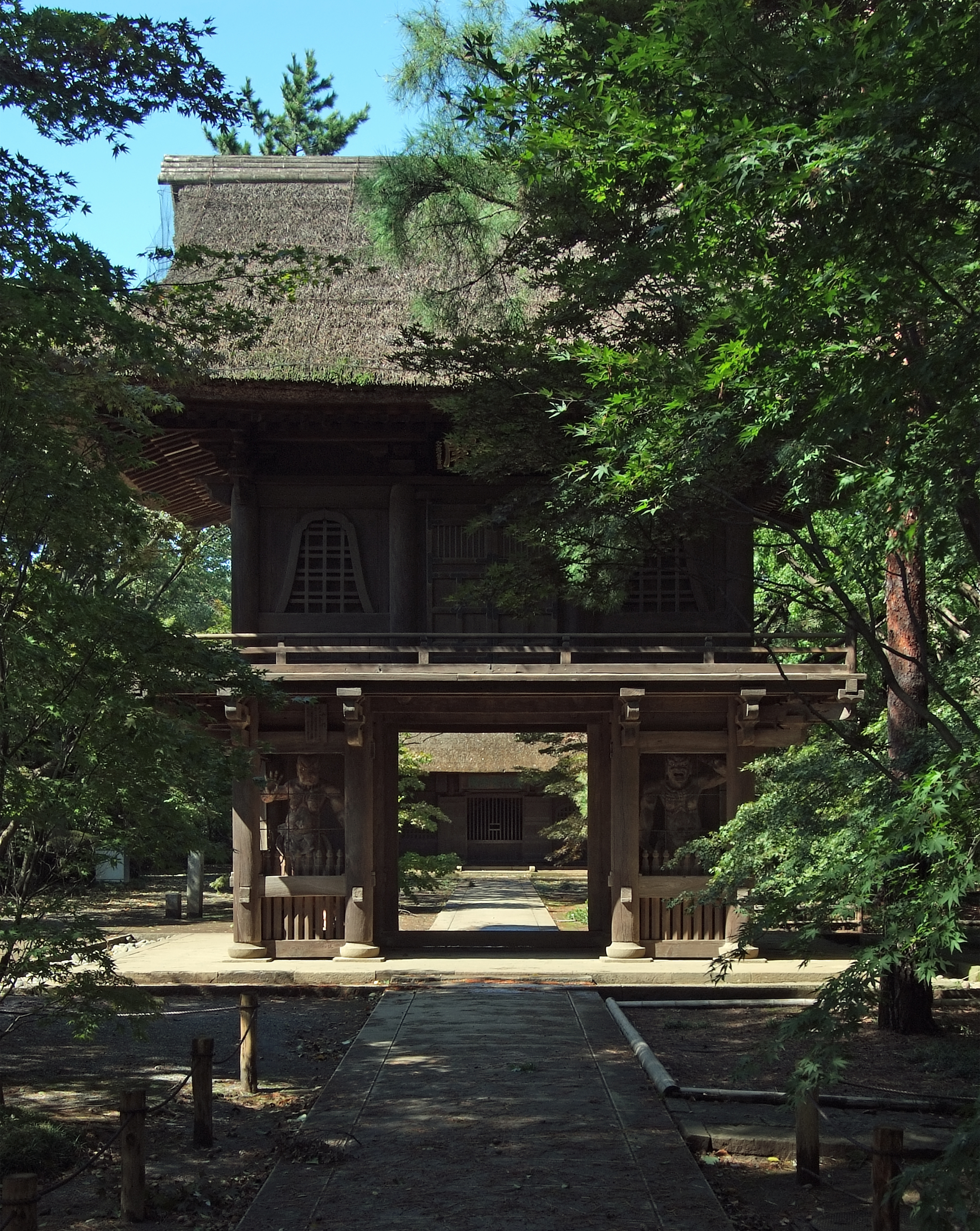
Main gate of Heirin-ji

Niiza (新座市, Niiza-shi) is a city in Saitama Prefecture, Japan. As of 1 January 2021, the city had an estimated population of 166,208 in 76,639 households and a population density of 7300 persons per km^{2}. The total area of the city is 22.78 square kilometres (8.80 sq mi).

== Geography ==
Niiza is located at the southernmost tip of Saitama Prefecture, and is essentially a suburb of the Tokyo conurbation. The entire city is located on the Musashino Plateau, with the Yanase River running through the western part of the city, and the Kurome River running through the eastern part of the city. Niiza includes the southernmost point of Saitama Prefecture, which faces Nishitōkyō of Tokyo.

=== Surrounding municipalities ===
Saitama Prefecture

- Asaka
- Miyoshi
- Shiki
- Tokorozawa

Tokyo Metropolis

- Higashikurume
- Kiyose
- Nerima
- Nishitokyo

=== Climate ===
Niiza has a humid subtropical climate (Köppen Cfa) characterized by warm summers and cool winters with light to no snowfall. The average annual temperature in Niiza is 14.9 °C. The average annual rainfall is 1449 mm with September as the wettest month. The temperatures are highest on average in August, at around 26.7 °C, and lowest in January, at around 4.1 °C.

== Demographics ==
Per Japanese census data, the population of Niiza has increased rapidly from the 1960s to the present day.

Historical population
| Year | Pop. | ±% |
|---|---|---|
| 1920 | 6,656 | — |
| 1930 | 7,095 | +6.6% |
| 1940 | 8,062 | +13.6% |
| 1950 | 11,059 | +37.2% |
| 1960 | 14,401 | +30.2% |
| 1970 | 77,704 | +439.6% |
| 1980 | 119,309 | +53.5% |
| 1990 | 138,919 | +16.4% |
| 2000 | 149,511 | +7.6% |
| 2010 | 158,777 | +6.2% |
| 2020 | 166,017 | +4.6% |

== History ==
The area of modern Niiza has been settled since prehistoric times. It was part of Shinra County within Musashi Province in the Nara period. Shinra County (新羅郡) was originally written with the same kanji as the ancient Korean kingdom of Silla, and the area was settled by immigrants from Silla in 758 AD. The name was changed to Niikura County (新座郡) in the Heian period.

The town of Owada was created within Niikura District, Saitama with the establishment of the modern municipalities system on April 1, 1889. Niikura District was abolished in 1896, becoming part of Kitaasachi District. On March 1, 1955, Owada annexed the neighboring village of Katayama becoming Niiza Town, which was raised to city status on November 1, 1970.

== Government ==
Niiza has a mayor-council form of government with a directly elected mayor and a unicameral city council of 26 members. Niiza contributes two members to the Saitama Prefectural Assembly. In terms of national politics, the city is part of Saitama 4th district of the lower house of the Diet of Japan. In the 2021 Japanese general election, from Saitama 4th district, Yasushi Hosaka was elected.

== Economy ==
Toppan printing has a large factory in Niiza, which is also home to a number of other light manufacturing, electronics and transportation/warehousing companies. However, due to its proximity to Tokyo, over a third of the workforce commutes daily, making Niiza largely a bedroom community.

== Education ==
Colleges and universities:

- Atomi University
- Jumonji University
- Rikkyo University

Primary and secondary schools:

- Niiza has 17 public elementary schools and six public middle schools operated by the city government, and three public high schools operated by the Saitama Prefectural Board of Education. In addition, there are two private combined junior/senior high schools.

== Transportation ==
=== Railway ===
JR East – Musashino Line

- Niiza

Tōbu Railway – Tōbu Tōjō Line

- Shiki

=== Highway ===
- Kan-etsu Expressway
- National Route 254
- National Route 463

== Military Facilities ==
United States Air Force, Owada Communication Site

Owada Communication Site is former communication site of Imperial Japanese Navy.

== Sister cities ==
Niiza is twinned with:

- Jyväskylä, Finland, since 1997
- Nasushiobara, Tochigi, Japan, since 2000
- Tōkamachi, Niigata, Japan, since 2002
- Jiyuan, China, since 2002
- Neuruppin, Germany, since 2003

== Local attractions ==
- Heirin-ji, a large Rinzai Zen Buddhist temple. The temple is located in Nobitome, close to Niiza City Hall.

== Notable people from Niiza ==
- Yoichi Furuya, former actor, known for his tenure as Jun Yazumi in Ultraman Tiga
- Umika Kawashima, actress
- Masaya Kikawada, actor
- Yoko Mitsuya, gravure idol
- Yuto Otsuka (basketball, born 1990)
- Masaaki Taniai, politician

== In popular culture ==
On April 7, 2003, Niiza gave the anime character Astro Boy an honorary citizenship to mark the date given as his birthdate in the original manga. Later in 2004, the theme music from the TV series would eventually be used to signal the departure of a train at JR Niiza Station on the JR Musashino Line.
