= Heirin-ji =

Buddhist temple in Saitama Prefecture, Japan

Coordinates: 35°47′23.86″N 139°33′36.81″E

- 金鳳山平林寺
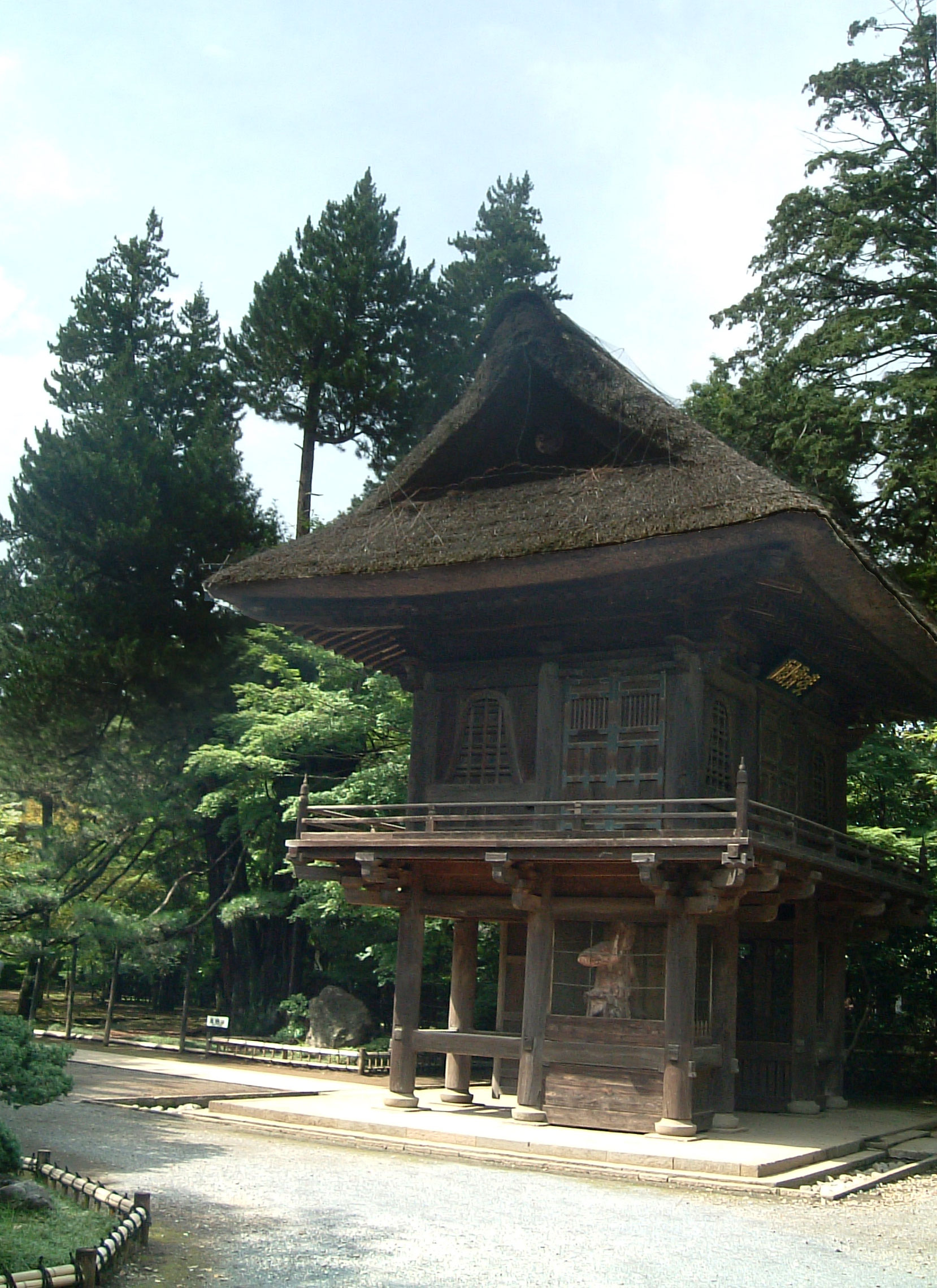
- Front gate at Heirinji

Religion
- Affiliation: Rinzai
- Deity: Shaka Nyorai

Location
- Location: 3-1-1 Nobidome, Niiza-shi, Saitama-ken
- Country: Japan
- Interactive map of Heirin-ji

Architecture
- Founder: Sekishitsu Zenkyū
- Completed: 1375

Website
- Official website (in Japanese)

Heirin-ji (平林寺) is a Rinzai temple of the Myoshin-ji branch located in Niiza city, Saitama prefecture, Japan, a city just outside Tokyo.

== History ==
The temple was founded in Iwatsuki, Saitama, in 1375 by Sekishitsu Zenkyū, who had served as the Abbot of Engaku-ji, Tenryū-ji and Shōfuku-ji. During this period the original temple was destroyed in 1590 during an attack on Iwatsuki Castle by Toyotomi Hideyoshi.

It was rebuilt in 1603 by Tokugawa Ieyasu and moved to Niiza city sixty years later. The temple grounds are situated in a forested area and is considered to be a national monument. Heirin-ji differs from other temples in the Tokyo area by having no temple markets nor public festivals held at the temple.

The temple remains a training temple for monks, who can often be seen working in the grounds. The grounds of the temple preserve a stretch of the Musashino woodlands. Animals such as raccoon dogs that are now not often seen in the city are found around the temple. The grounds also provide a roost for a large number of Japanese crows. The gardens are notable for the maple trees in autumn and the ume blossoms in early spring. The bell, with the ume blossom, was the inspiration for one of Toshi Yoshida's wood block prints.

== Gallery ==
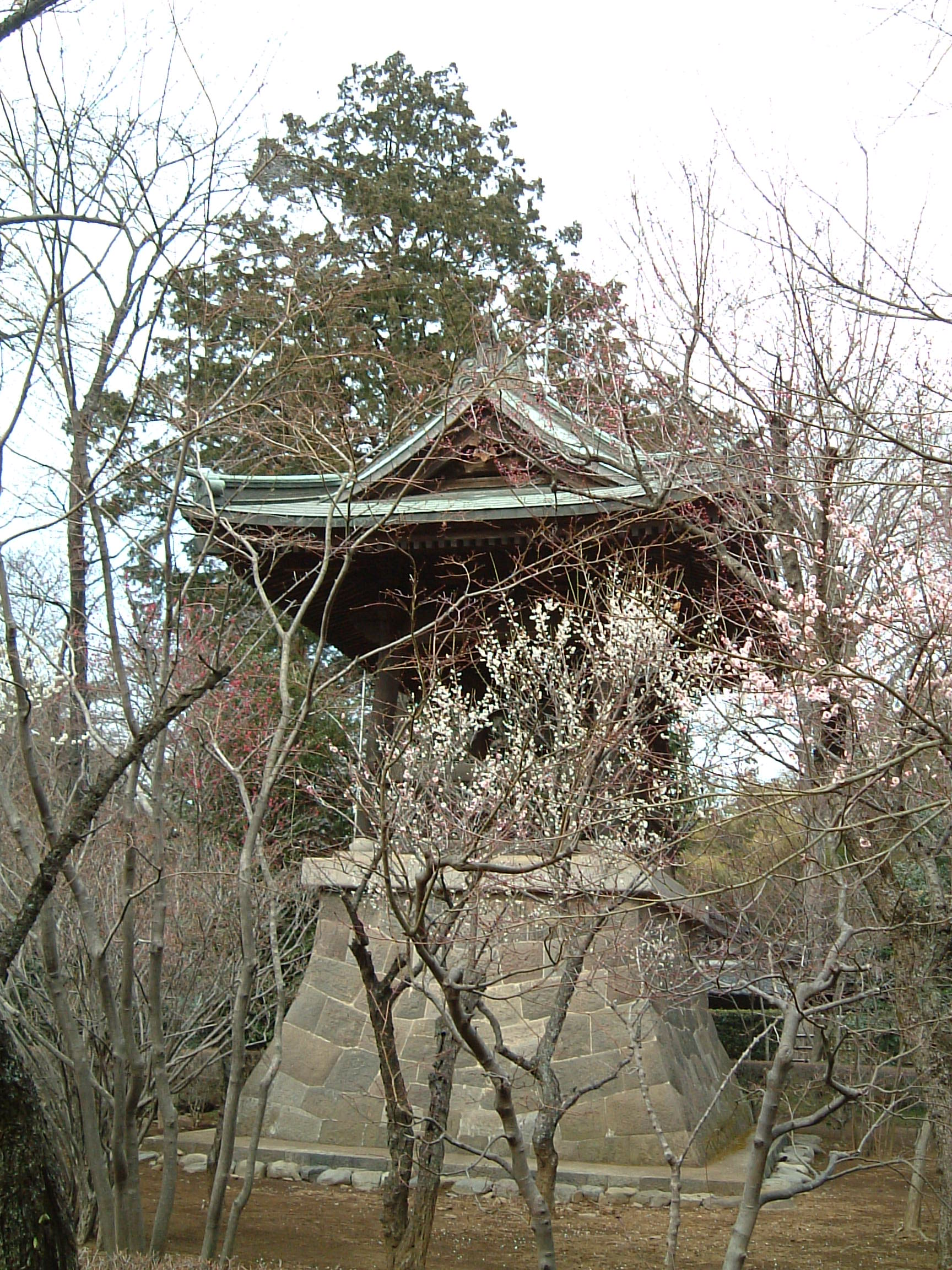
Temple bell of Heirinji

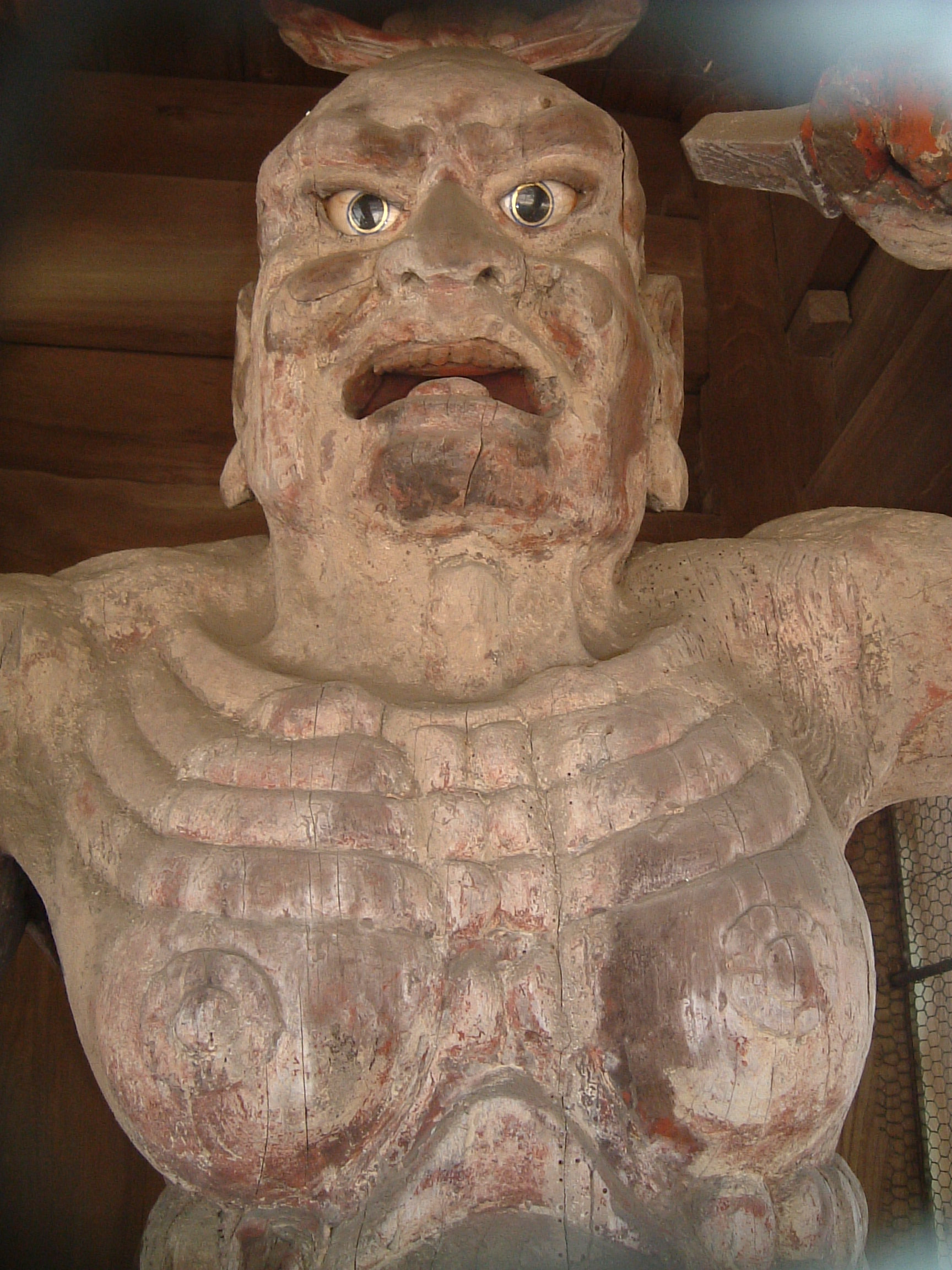
Nio, a temple guardian

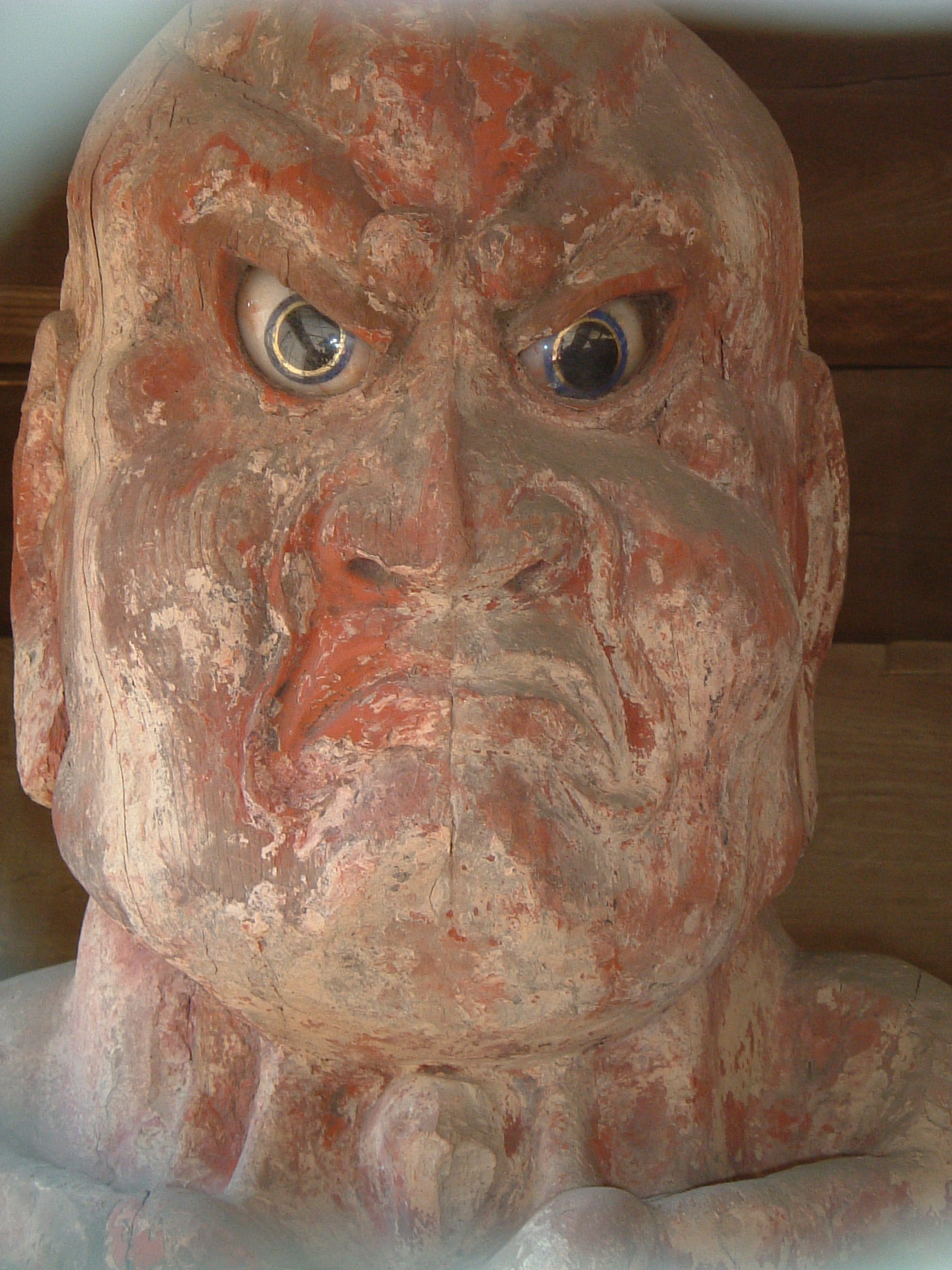
Nio, a temple guardian

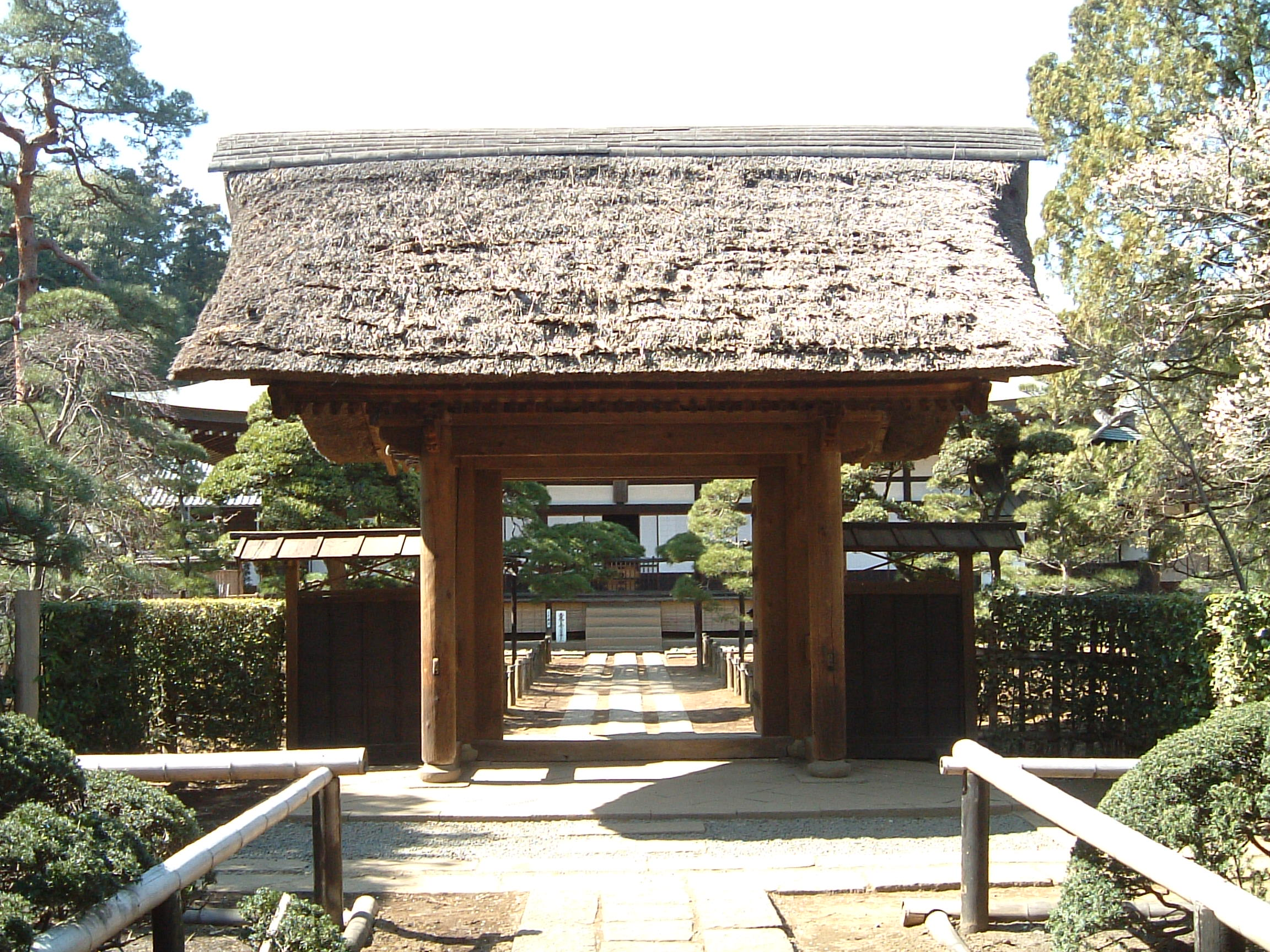
The thatched inner gate

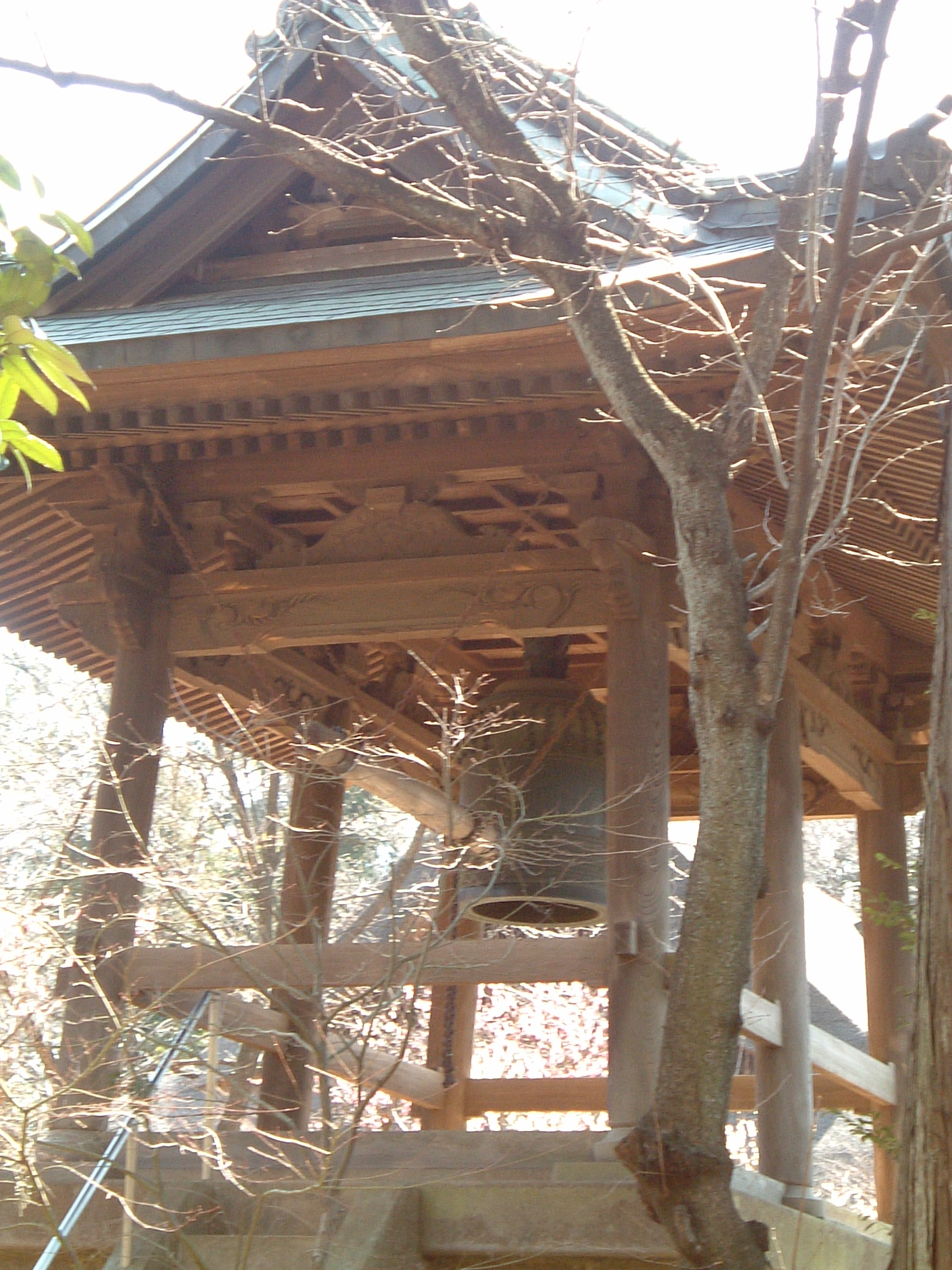
The temple bell

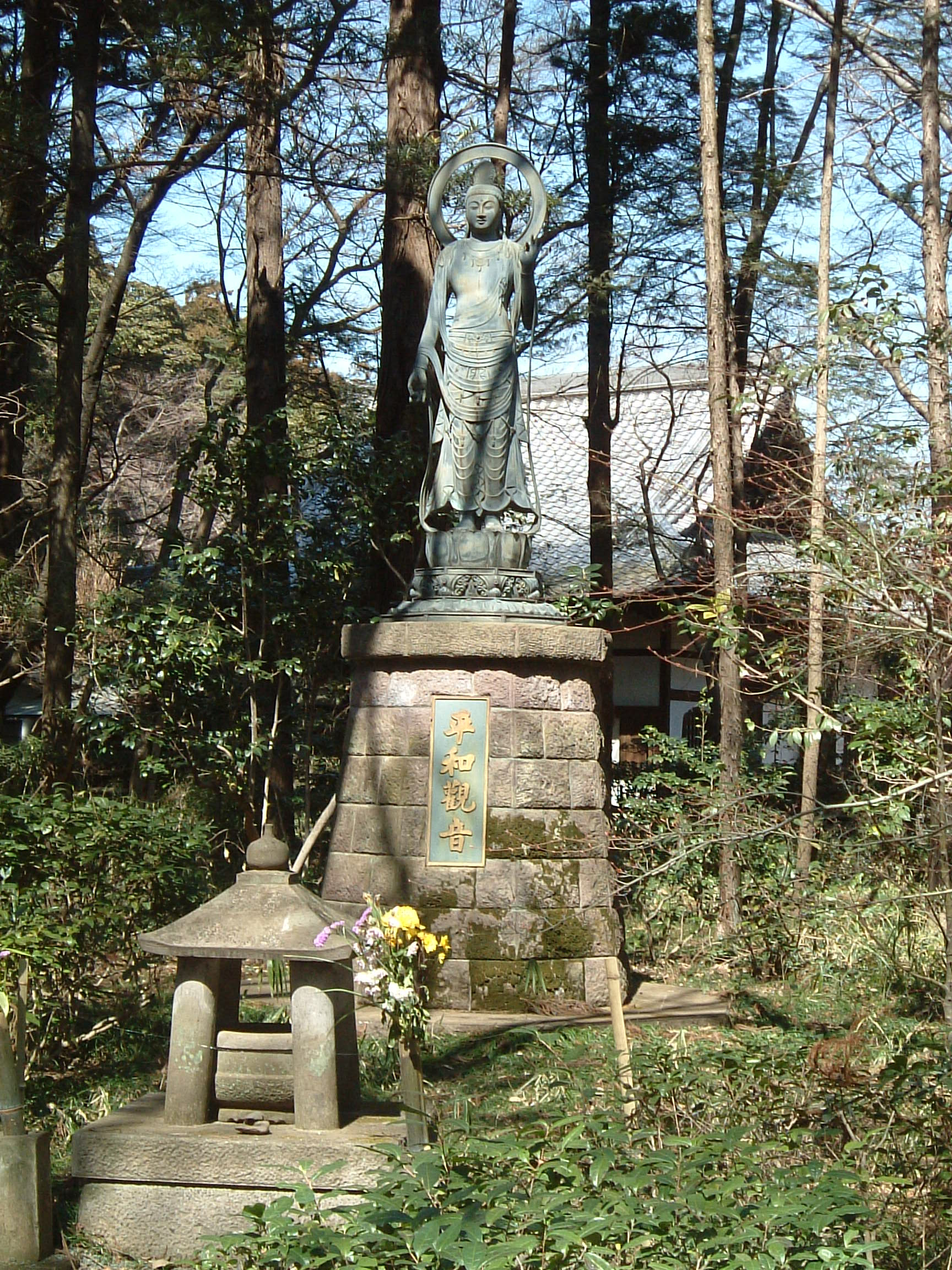
A statue of Kannon a goddess of mercy

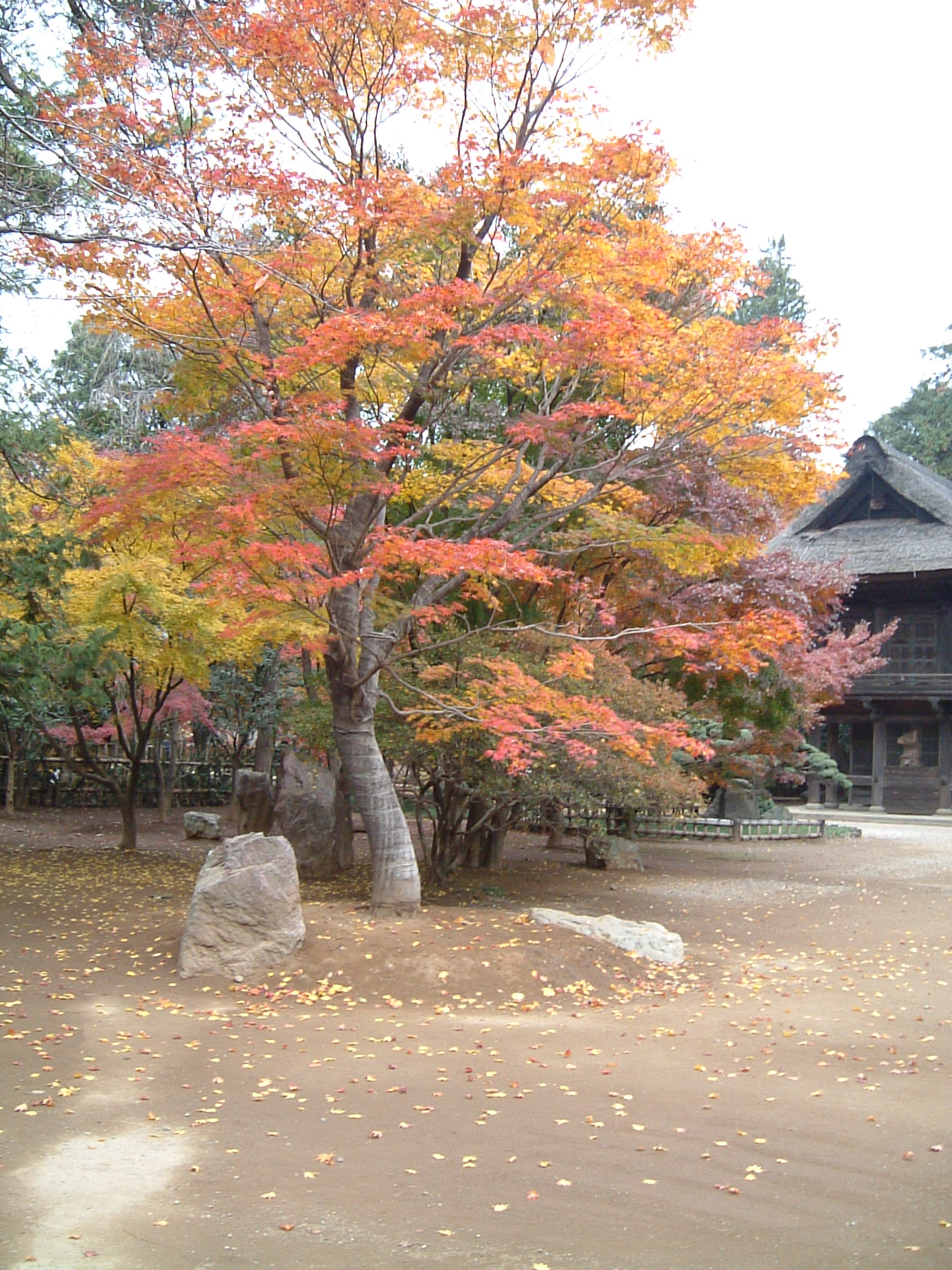
Maple tree in autumn at Heirinji
