= Jumonji University =

Higher education institution in Saitama Prefecture, Japan

- 十文字学園女子大学
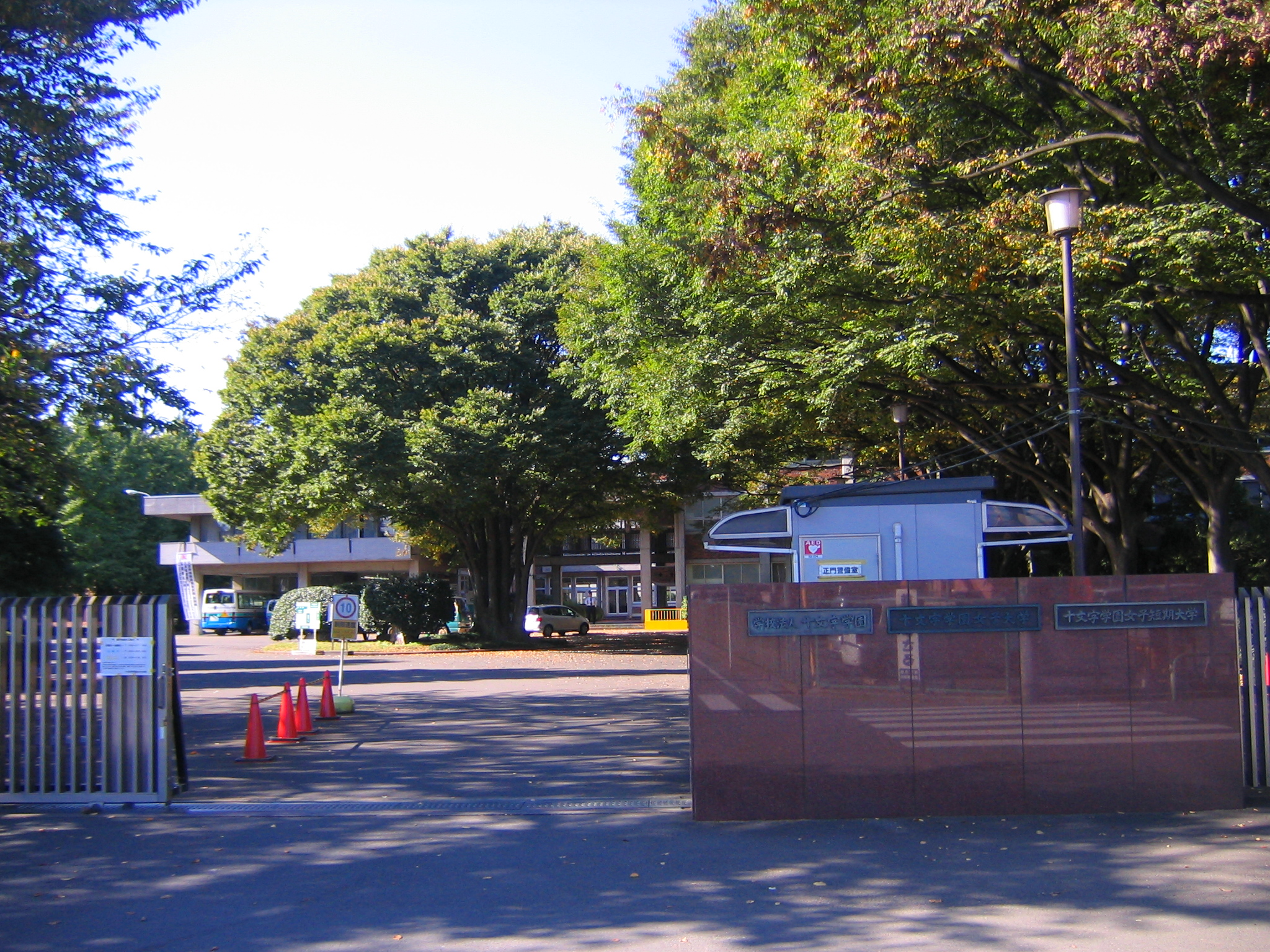
- Established: 1996
- Location: Niiza, Saitama, Japan; 35°47′57″N 139°33′02″E

Jumonji University (十文字学園女子大学, Juumonji gakuen joshi daigaku) is a private women's college in Niiza, Saitama, Japan, established in 1996. The predecessor of the school, Bunka Girl's High School, was founded in 1922. The current President of Jumonji University is Fumio Shimura.

== Alumni ==
- Maki Sakai, an actress (who graduated from the attached junior college)
- Mayumi Ono, an actress
