= List of women ukiyo-e and shin-hanga artists =

Wikimedia list article

The list of women ukiyo-e and shin-hanga artists attempts to include women artists who were involved with the ukiyo-e production, including painting(肉筆画, nikuhitsu-ga ) and woodblock printing(木版画, mokuhan-ga) from Edo period to Meiji era, as well as women shin-hanga artist with the aim of reviving the ukiyo-e tradition, and post-war women "contemporary ukiyo-e" artists from the 20th century onwards.
This list also includes non-Japanese women who studied ukiyo-e painting and/or woodblock printing in Japan.

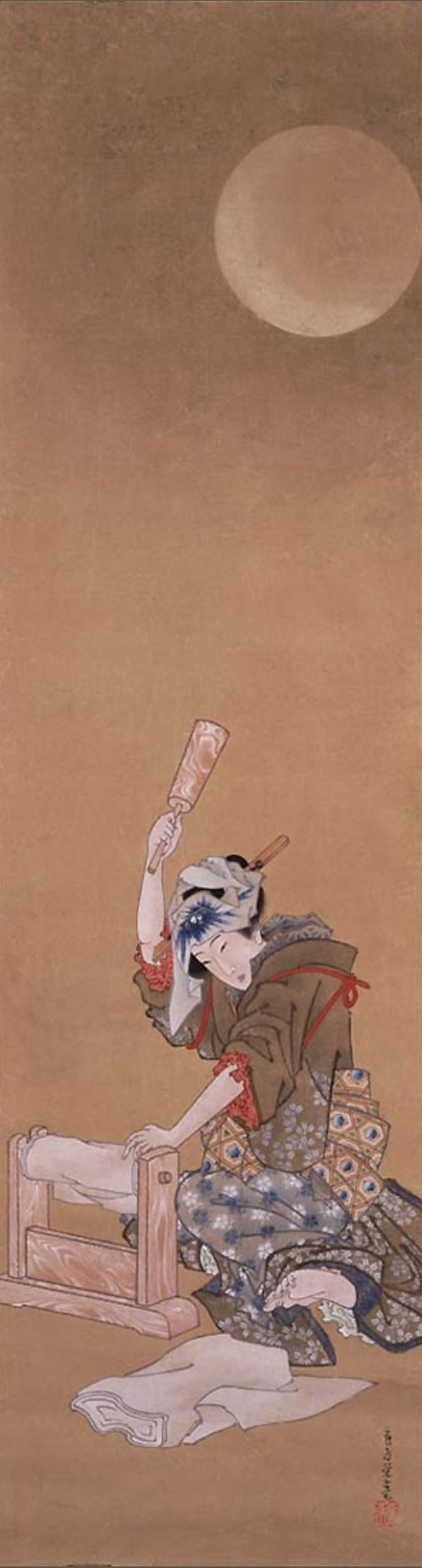
Kinuta or Beauty Fulling Cloth in the Moonlight (19th century Edo period) by Katsushika Ōi

- Hasegawa Sadanobu V, Japanese, 1946-
- Hishikawa San, Japanese, ?-?, granddaughter of Hishikawa Moronobu.
- Hirai Renzan, Japanese, 1798-1886.
- Helen Hyde, American, 1868-1919, pupil of Emil Orlik, Bernard Leach and Kanō Tomonobu.
- Inagaki Tsuru-jo, Japanese, ?-?
- Isome Tsuna-jo, Japanese, ?-?
- Katsura Miki-jo, Japanese, ?-?, pupil of Katsura Munenobu .
- Katsushika Ōi, Japanese, ?-?, daughter of Katsuhitsa Hokusai.
- Katsushika Tashu-jo, Japanese, ?-?, alias of Katsushika Ōi?
- Elizabeth Keith, Scottish, 1887–1956, shin-hanga artist.
- Kikukawa Eishi, Japanese, ?-?
- Kitagawa Chiyo-jo, Japanese, ?-?, wife of Kitagawa Utamaro or alias of Utamaro himself?
- Kubo Hatsu, Japanese, ?-?
- Bertha Lum, American, 1869–1954
- Meirindō Kakuju-jo, Japanese, ?-?, pupil of Utagawa Sadakame?
- Lilian May Miller, American, 1895-1943, shin-hanga artist, pupil of Kanō Tomonobu and Shimada Bokusen.
- Nakae Gyokkei, Japanese, ?-?, pupil of Takeuchi Keishū.
- Nagahara Baien, Japanese, 1823-1898, sister of Hirai Renzan.
- Nishikawa Mume, Japanese, ?-?, daughter of Nishikawa Terunobu
- Ran-jo, Japanese, ?-?
- Noémi Raymond, French-American, 1889-1980, shin-hanga artist.
- Shinohara-jo, Japanese, ?-?
- Sekichū-jo, Japanese, c.1763-?
- Sekiryū-jo, Japanese, c.1769-?
- Torii Kiyomitsu (Torii Setsuko), Japanese, 1938-2021, daughter of Torii Kotondo.
- Tsubaki Anna, Japanese, 1970-
- Utagawa Kunikame, Japanese, 1810-1871, daughter of Utagawa Toyokuni.
- Utagawa Kunikume, Japanese, ?-?, pupil of Utagawa Toyokuni II
- Utagawa Sadakame, Japanese, ?-?, pupil of Utagawa Kunisada.
- Utagawa Yoshi-jo, Japanese, 1842-?, daughter of Utagawa Kuniyoshi.
- Utagawa Yoshitama, Japanese, 1836-1870, pupil of Utagawa Kuniyoshi and Shibata Zeshin.
- Utagawa Yoshitori-jo, Japanese, 1839-?, daughter of Utagawa Kuniyoshi.
- Yamazaki Ryū-jo, Japanese, ?-?, pupil of Hisikawa Moronobu?
- Yorozuya Issai, Japanese, 1960-

== Gallery ==
山海目出たい図会 くせが直したい, main bijin-ga part by Utagawa Kuniyoshi, upper landscape part by his daughter Utagawa Yoshitori-jo, 1852.

早野勘平 坂東彦三郎・こし元おかる 沢村田之助 from the ukiyo-e print album "Azuma nishiki-e" by Meirindō Kakuju-jo, 1862.

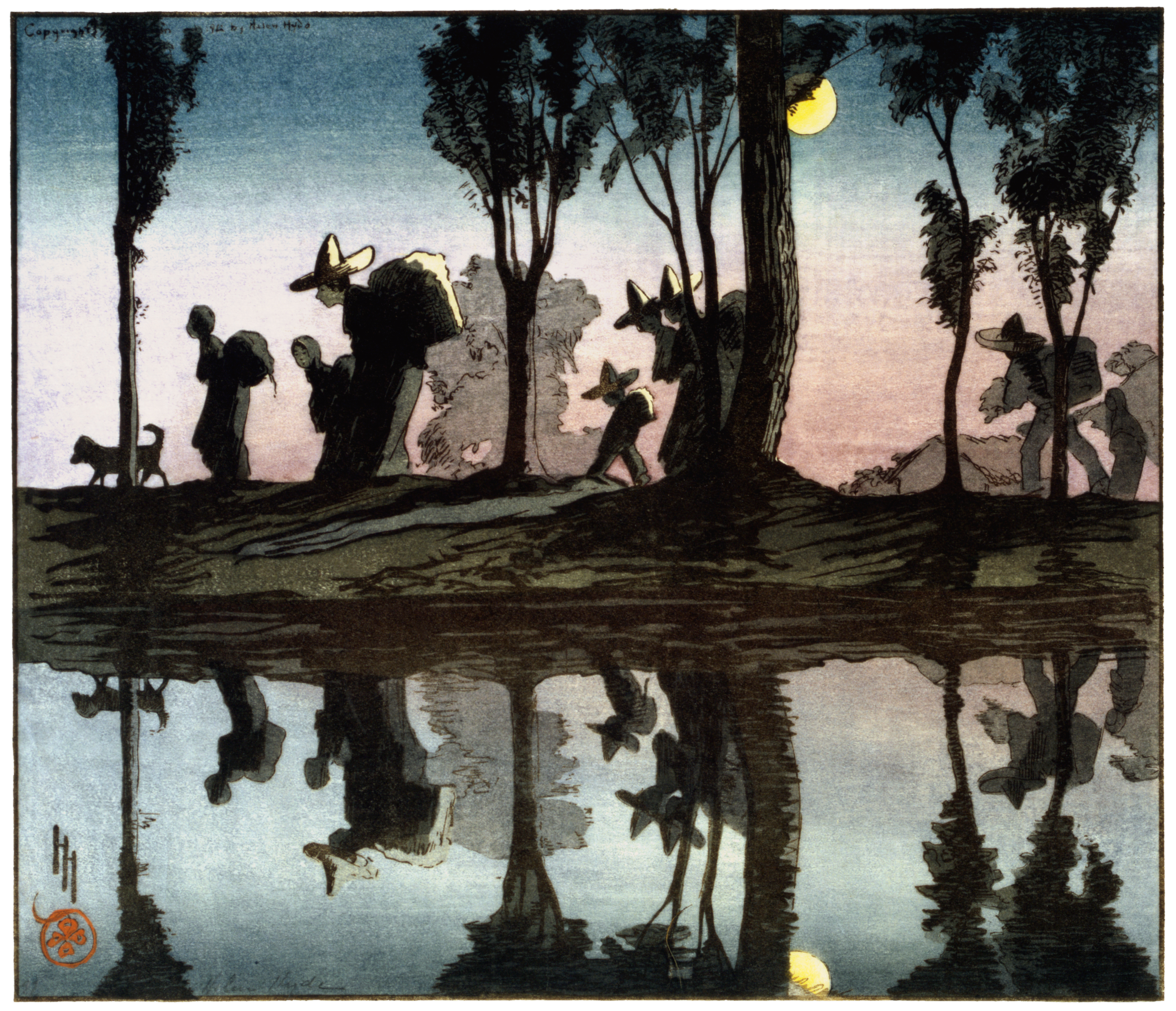
Moonlight on the Viga Canal by Helen Hyde, 1912.

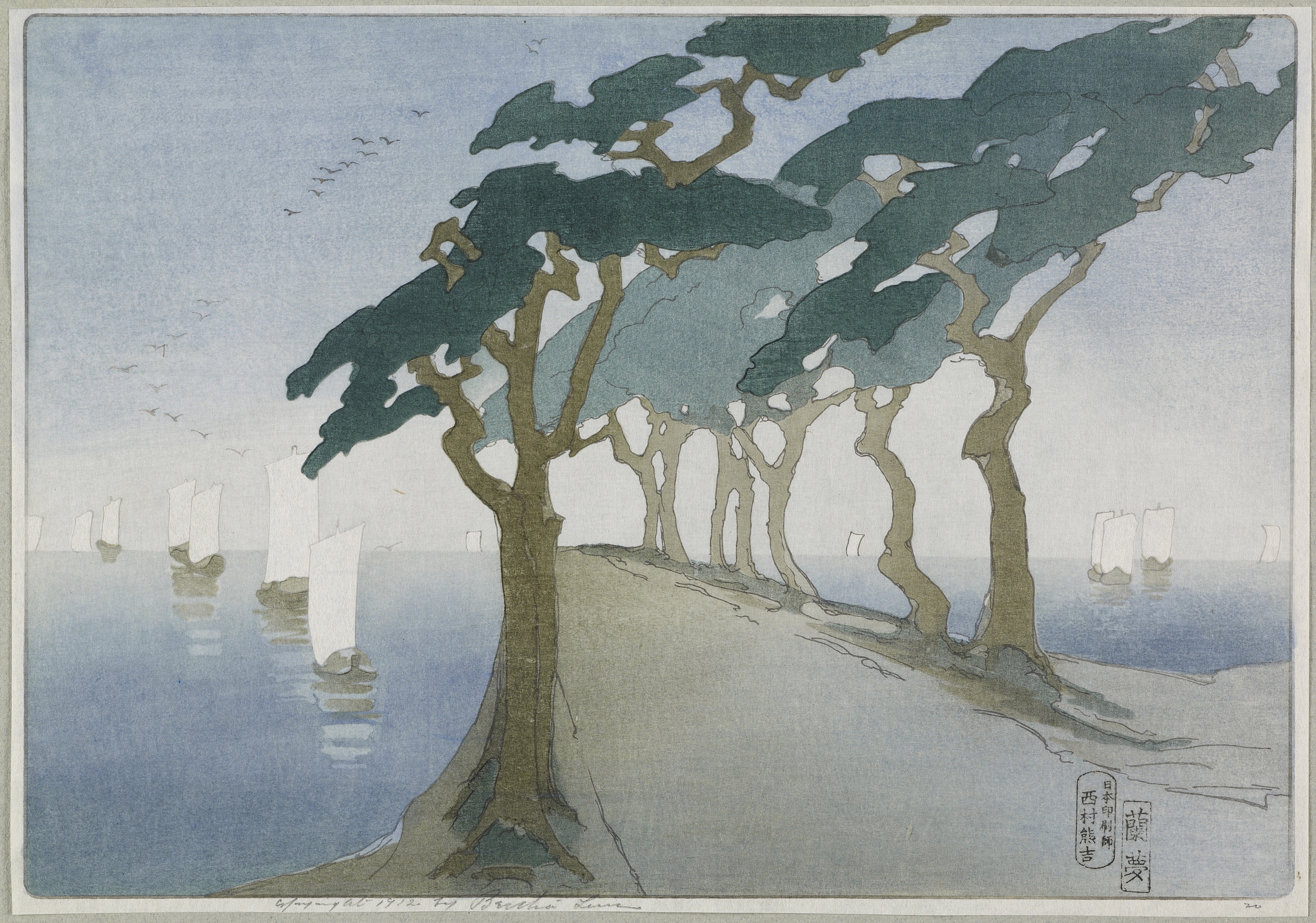
Pines by the Sea by Bertha Lum, 1912.

== See also ==
- Ukiyo-e
- Women artists

== Bibliography ==
- Kuwabara, Yōjirō (1923). 浮世絵師人名辞書. 教文館.
- Inoue, Kazuo (1931). 浮世絵師伝. 渡辺版画店.
- Nihon Ukiyo-e Kyōkai (日本浮世絵協会) (1982). 原色浮世絵大百科事典（第2巻）. 大修館書店.
- Takigawa, Kyōji (2021). アート・ビギナーズ・コレクション もっと知りたい 川瀬巴水と新版画. 東京美術. ISBN 978-4-8087-1182-5.
- Takigawa, Kyōji (2024). 川瀬巴水と新版画の作家たち 逝きし風景を求めて. Heibonsha. ISBN 978-4-5829-2314-8.
