= HOM =

HOM, Hom or similar may refer to:

== Places ==
- Le Hom, former name of the commune Thury-Harcourt-le-Hom in France
- Hom, Šentrupert, a dispersed settlement in Slovenia
- Hom-e Khosrow, a village in Iran

== Science and mathematics ==
- Hom bundle, in topology
- Hom functor, in category theory
- $\operatorname{Hom}(V,K)$, the set of linear forms from a vector space to its field
- Higher-order modulation, in telecommunications
- Hong–Ou–Mandel effect in quantum optics

== Other uses ==
- HOM Furniture, an American furniture retailer
- Hom (surname), a Danish, Dutch, English, and Taishanese surname
- Hom (instrument), a class of traditional Mayan musical instruments
- H0m scale, a model railway scale or gauge
- Hall of mirrors effect, in computer graphics
- Harm to ongoing matter, phrase used for class of material being redacted from the Mueller Report, for reasons of legal investigation
- Head of mission, the head of a diplomatic representation
- Heart of Midlothian F.C., an association football club in Scotland
- Heart of Misery, a song by Finnish rock band The Rasmus
- Ho Man Tin station, Hong Kong, MTR station code
- Holland (Amtrak station), in Michigan, United States
- Homa language, spoken in South Sudan
- Homa (ritual), in Hinduism
- Homer Airport in Homer, Alaska
- House of Milan, an American publisher of bondage magazines
- Armenian Relief Society (Armenian: Հայ Օգնութեան Միութիւն, ՀՕՄ, HOM)
- His Orthodox Majesty, a title occasionally used by kings in Poland
- HOM, a luxury men's underwear brand owned by Triumph International

== See also ==
- Homs (disambiguation)
