= Homme =

Homme may refer to:

== People ==
- Homme, the French language word for "man" or "human"
- Homme (surname), a list of people with the surname Homme

== Places ==
- Homme, Agder, a village in the municipality of Valle in Agder county, Norway
- Homme dam, a dam which created Homme lake near Park River, North Dakota, USA

== Other ==
- Bête, a historical French card game originally known as jeu de l'homme, l'homme or homme
- Homme (duo), a South Korean musical duo
- Homme by David Beckham, a men's eau de toilette fragrance endorsed by English footballer David Beckham

== See also ==
- Homm (disambiguation)
