= Hom (surname) =

- Language: Danish, Dutch, English, Taishanese

Other names
- Variant forms: English: Home, Homme, Holme; Chinese: Tan, Tam

Hom is a surname in various cultures. Its languages of origin include Danish, Dutch, English, and Taishanese.

== Origins ==
Hom may be:

- An English surname, a variant of Home, Homme, or Holme. It originated variously as a toponymic surname (referring to Hume, Scottish Borders, or to places named Home in Clifton-upon-Teme and Feckenham), and from Middle English holm ("islet") or holin ("holly tree").
- A Chinese surname (譚), spelled in Mandarin Pinyin as Tán. The spelling Hom is based on the Taishanese pronunciation. That surname originated as a topoynmic surname referring to the ancient state of Tan.
- A Danish surname of unexplained origin.
- A Dutch surname of unexplained origin.

== Statistics ==
In the Netherlands, there were 166 people with the surname Hom as of 2007, up from 124 in 1947.

As of 2018, 29 people in Denmark bore the surname Høm, and two the surname Hom.

According to statistics cited by Patrick Hanks, 17 people on the island of Great Britain and none on the island of Ireland bore the surname Hom in 2011. In 1881 there were four people with the surname in Great Britain.

The 2010 United States census found 4,863 people with the surname Hom, making it the 6,906th-most-common name in the country. This represented a decrease from 5,015 (6,262nd-most-common) in the 2000 Census. In both censuses, about four-fifths of the bearers of the surname identified as Asian, and one-tenth as White. It was the 269th-most-common surname among respondents to the 2000 Census who identified as Asian.

== People ==
People with the surname Hom or Høm include:

- Paul Høm (1905–1994), Danish painter and stained glass artist
- Tom Hom (born 1927), American politician
- Jesper Høm (1931–2000), Danish photographer and film director
- Tonnie Hom (1932–2013), Dutch swimmer
- Ken Hom (born 1949), American chef
- Sharon Hom (born 1951), Hong Kong-born American human rights law professor
- Alice Y. Hom (born 1967), American LGBTQ community activist
- Marc Hom (born 1967), Danish fashion photographer
- Jennifer Hom (fl. 2004–present), American mathematician

== See also ==
- Pol Hom (born 1946), Cambodian politician (Hom is his given name)
- Shuvagata Hom (born 1986), Bangladeshi cricketer (his surname is Chowdury)
