= Holme (surname) =

Holme is a surname and may refer to:

- Alan Holme (1872–1931), British administrator in India
- Ash Holme (born 1996), English media personality
- Bob Holme (born 1969), American ski jumper
- Charles Holme (1848–1923), English journalist and art critic
- Edward Holme (1770–1847), English physician
- Henry Holme (1839–1891), Anglican bishop
- John Francis Holme (1868–1904), American newspaper artist and book printer
- Jørn Holme (born 1959), Norwegian judge and civil servant
- Phil Holme (born 1947), Welsh footballer
- Randle Holme, list page
- Richard Holme, Baron Holme of Cheltenham
- Robert Holme (disambiguation), multiple people
- Thea Holme (1904–1980), English actor and writer
- Thomas Holme (1624–1695), Surveyor General of Pennsylvania
- Timothy Holme (1928–1987), English author

== See also ==
- Holmes (surname)
