= Lhomme (surname) =

Lhomme is a surname. Notable people with the surname include:

- Fabrice Lhomme (born 1965), French investigative journalist
- Pierre Lhomme (1930–2019), French cinematographer and filmmaker
- Stéphane Lhomme (born 1965), French anti-nuclear activist

== See also ==
- Homme (surname)
