= Homm =

Homm may refer to:

- Heroes of Might and Magic, abbreviated as HoMM, a series of video games
- Homm, one of hotel brands of Singaporean Banyan Group
- Florian Homm (born 1959), German businessman

== See also ==
- Homme (disambiguation)
- Homs (disambiguation)
