= Shunsen =

Shunsen may refer to:

- the Japanese reading of the name of the South Korean city Chuncheon
- an art name of the Japanese painter Kanō Tomonobu
