= Helen Hyde =

American etcher and engraver

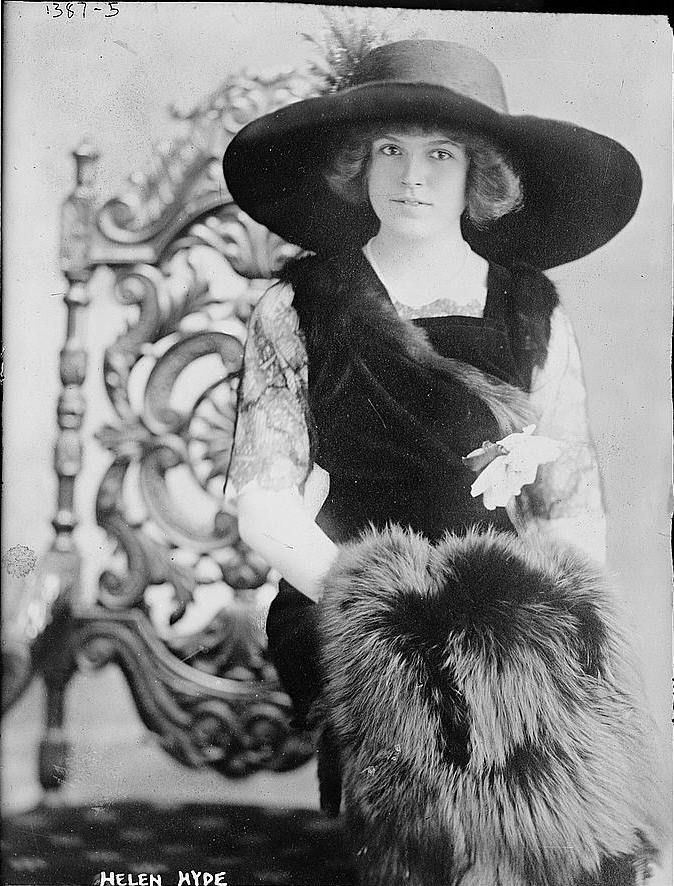
- Hyde in 1890
- Born: April 6, 1868; Lima, New York, US
- Died: May 13, 1919 (aged 51)
- Education: San Francisco Art Institute
- Known for: etcher, painter, printmaker

Helen Hyde (April 6, 1868 – May 13, 1919) was an etcher and engraver from the United States. She is best known for her color etching process and woodblock prints reflecting Japanese women and children characterizations.

== Life ==
Born in Lima, New York, Hyde spent her adolescent years in California. Her art education began at the age of twelve when she studied for two years with her neighbour, Ferdinand Richardt, an American-Danish artist. After the death of Hyde's father in 1882, her aunt, Augusta Bixler, provided the remaining Hyde family with a home in San Francisco. Between 1882 and 1888, Hyde continued her education by graduating from Wellesley School for Girls and attending the California School of Design. For the next six years, Hyde developed her artistic talents through her studies with Franz Skarbina in Berlin, and Raphaël Collin and Félix Régamey in Paris. Régamey introduced Hyde to the Japonism movement through his vast Japanese art collection. The paintings of Mary Cassatt, an American impressionist, were also very influential in Hyde's decision to focus on Japanese attributes in her works. Mary Cassatt's paintings were significantly inspired by Japanese works of art, and many of her paintings were women and children themes. Hyde also studied with Emil Carlsen, an American painter, and Kanō Tomonobu, the final master painter at the famous Kanō school of Japanese painting.

By 1894, Hyde had returned to California and began to sketch likenesses of Chinatown women and children. Through her association with the Sketch Club, Hyde met and became friends with Josephine Hyde. Together they attempted color etchings, and in 1899, the two Hyde women settled in Japan to study the country's painting techniques.

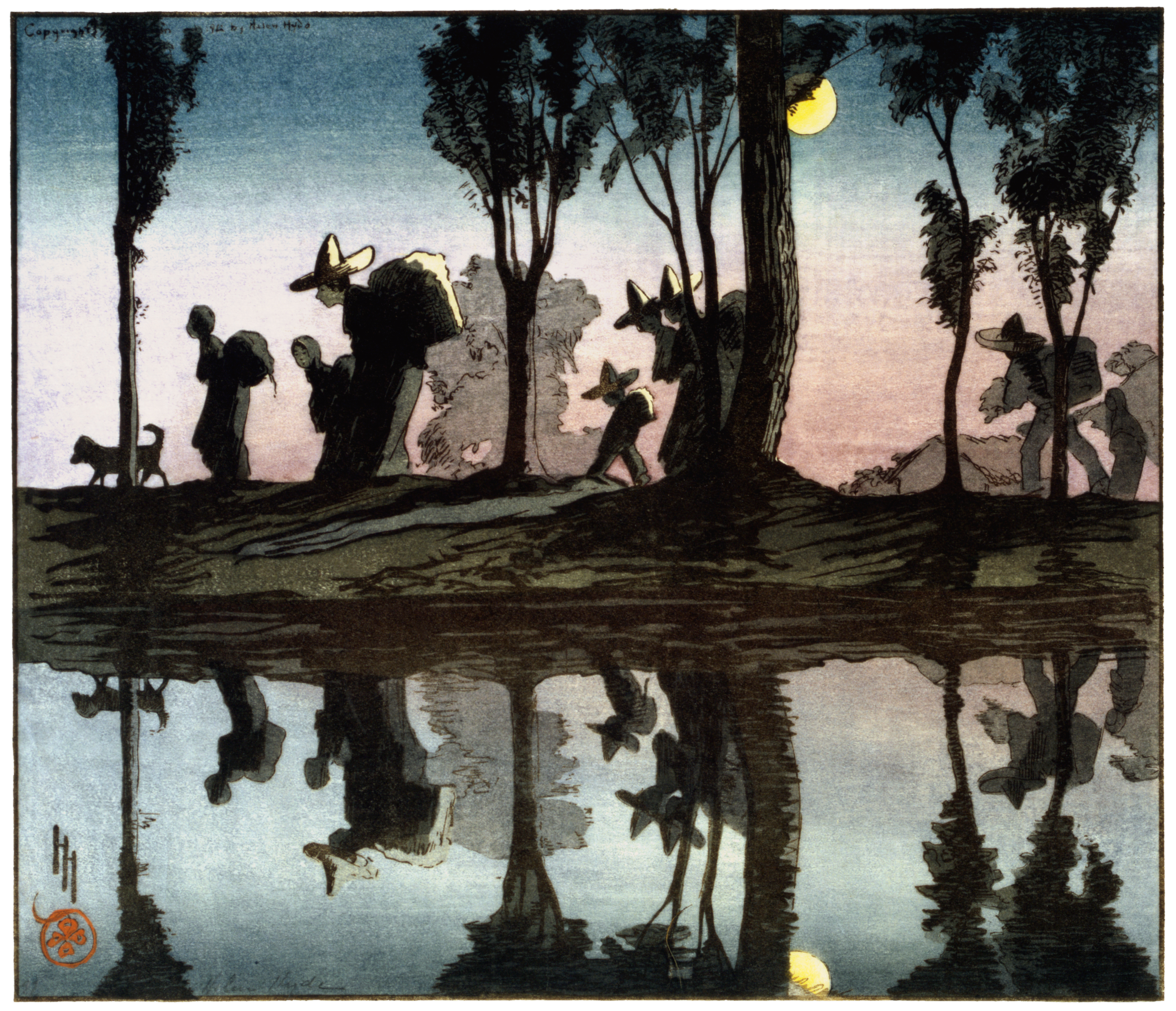
Moonlight on the Viga Canal – a color woodcut made by Hyde in 1912

While Josephine Hyde returned to America, Helen Hyde continued her study in Japan in color woodblock printing. In Japan, Helen Hyde learned the Japanese woodblock printing techniques from masters such as Emil Orlik, a European living in Japan. Hyde resided in Japan from 1903 through 1913 and refined color woodblock printing to a fine art. During this time, Hyde also traveled extensively to China, India, and Mexico. In 1914, Hyde left Japan and took up residency in the United States until her death in 1919. In its tribute to Hyde, The American Magazine of Art remarked:

There is a charm about her rendition of children, whether they be Japanese, Chinese, Mexican or American, which gives token to her sympathy with childhood.

— American Magazine of Art

== Work ==
Hyde's prints are still sold at public galleries, and a vast collection of her works are within the confines of the Library of Congress in Washington, D.C. Examples of Hyde's works can be seen at the Smithsonian American Art Museum in Washington, D.C. Two of Hyde's award winning works are "A Monarch of Japan" and "Baby Talk". In 1901, Hyde's "A Monarch of Japan" took first place in the Nihon Kaiga Kyokai exhibition. This work is now housed at the Smithsonian American Art Museum. In 1909, Hyde's "Baby Talk" received a Gold Medal at the Alaska–Yukon–Pacific Exposition. This work is now housed at the Smithsonian American Art Museum.

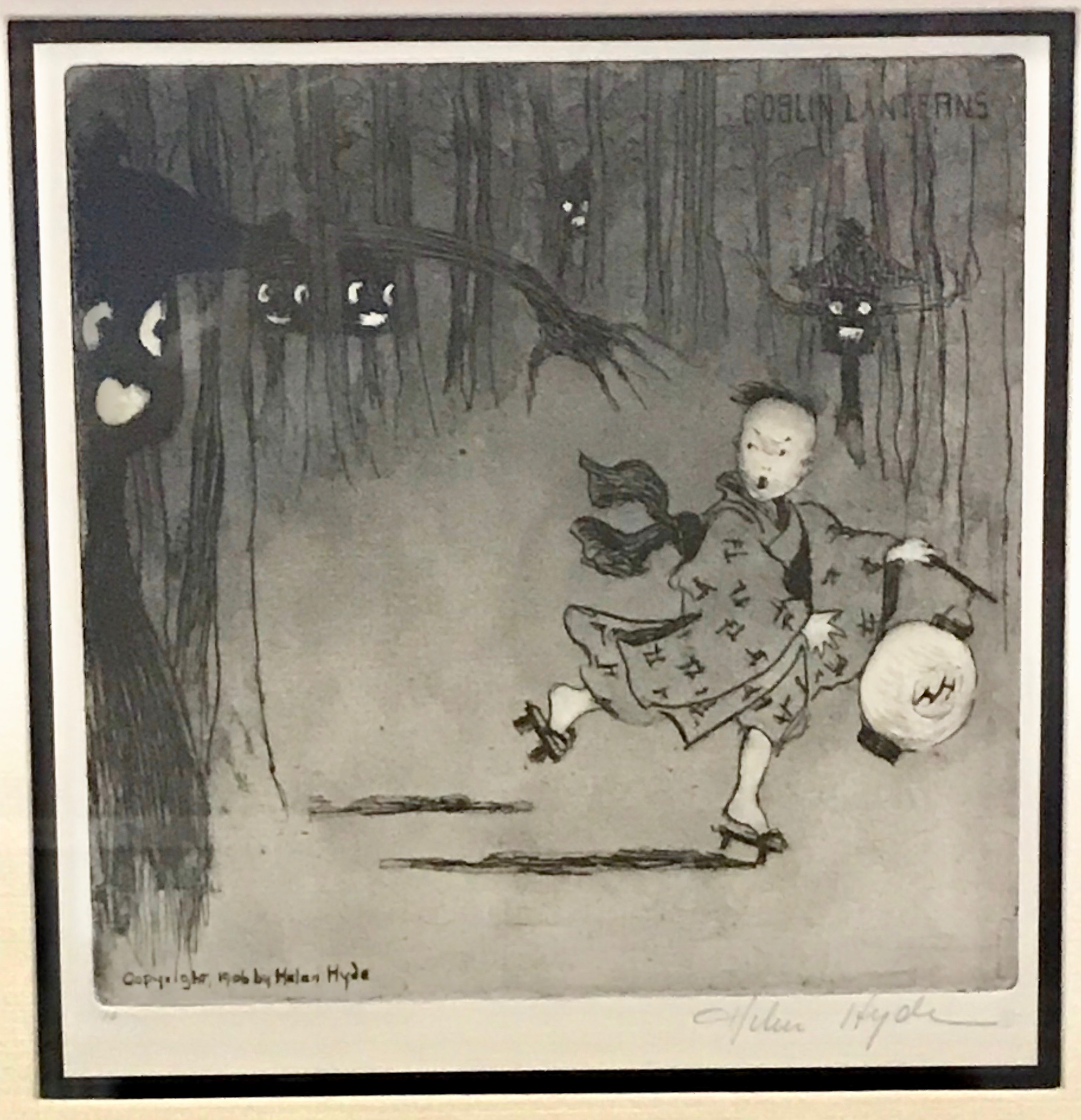

== See also ==
Other western women who lived in Japan and made woodprints

- Lilian May Miller
- Bertha Lum
- Elizabeth Keith
