= Bertha Lum =

American artist (1869–1954)

Bertha Boynton Lum
- Born: May 1869; Tipton, Iowa, U.S.
- Died: February 1954 (aged 84–85); Genoa, Italy
- Known for: Painting, printmaking

Bertha Boynton Lum (1869 – 1954) was an American artist known for helping popularize the Japanese and Chinese woodblock print outside of Asia.

== Early life ==
In May 1869, Lum was born as Bertha Boynton Bull in Tipton, Iowa. Lum's father was Joseph W. Bull (1841–1923), a lawyer and her mother was Harriet Ann Boynton (1842–1925), a school teacher. Both of Lum's parents were amateur artists. Lum had a sister and two brothers, Clara, Carlton, and Emerson.

== Education and career ==
In 1890 she lived in Duluth and listed her occupation as artist. She enrolled in the design department of the Art Institute of Chicago in 1895. A few years later she studied stained glass with Anne Weston and attended the Frank Holme School of Illustration. From November 1901 to March 1902, she studied figure drawing at the Art Institute of Chicago and was influenced by the Japanese techniques of Arthur Wesley Dow in his book Composition, which was published in 1899.

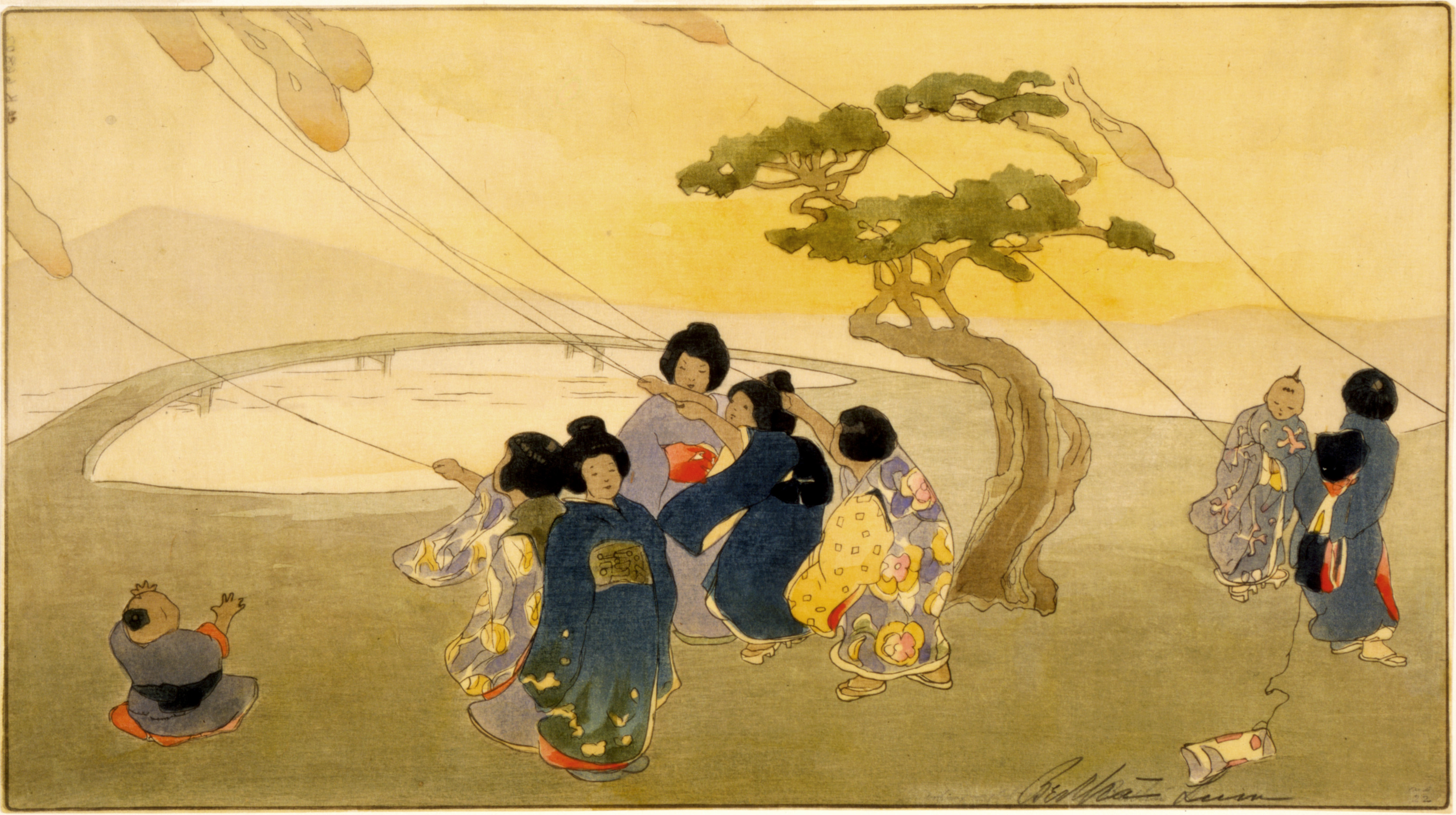
Bertha Boynton Lum, Kites, 1913. Woodblock print.

Lum married Burt F. Lum, a corporate lawyer from Minneapolis, Minnesota, in 1903. They spent their seven-week honeymoon in Japan, where she searched for a print maker who could teach her the traditional ukiyo-e method. Toward the end of her stay in Japan, she found a shop that reproduced old prints. The shop sold her some woodcutting tools that she began using upon her return to Minneapolis. On January 23, 1907, she went to Japan for a 14-week stay. With help from a professor at the Imperial Art School in Tokyo, she was introduced to the block cutter Igami Bonkutsu (1875–1933) in Yokohama. Lum worked with Bonkutsu for two months. After she learned how to cut blocks, Bonkutsu introduced her to the printer Nishimura Kamakichi, with whom she worked for another four weeks.

For three years in the U.S., Lum cut blocks and colored and printed her work herself. The Society of Arts and Crafts in Boston named Lum a master craftsman in 1908. After returning to Japan in 1911 for six months, she began to hire cutters and printers who worked in her winter home in Tokyo.

In 1912 Lum was the only female artist to exhibit at the Tokyo International Exhibition. She was awarded a silver medal at the 1915 Panama–Pacific International Exposition for her color woodcuts. Between 1915 and 1919 she made two more trips to Japan and made an extensive number of prints. She also exhibited at the Los Angeles County Museum of Art in 1920 and at the Art Institute of Chicago and the Chicago Society of Etchers, as well as the New York Public Library. Her first illustrated book, Gods, Goblins, and Ghosts, based on her travels in Japan, was published in 1922. The same year, she moved to China and began learning Chinese woodcut methods.

During the Great Depression, Lum made a living selling prints and illustrating books, newspapers, and magazines, including the New York Herald Tribune and Good Housekeeping. She made her last known print in 1935; her print of the god Daïkoku was published in The Peking Chronicle in December 1937. In 1936 she published Gangplanks to the East, a collection of Asian folk tales and stories of her travels. She had her last exhibition in 1941. Her works are held at the Library of Congress, the Fine Arts Museums of San Francisco, the Smithsonian Museum of American Art, and in private collections.

Lum was a member of the Asiatic Society of Japan, California Society of Etchers (now California Society of Printmakers), and Print Makers Society of California.

== Personal life ==
Lum lived in California (San Francisco and Hollywood) from 1917 until 1922 when she moved to Peking, China. For the next thirty years she divided her time between California, China, and Japan. She divorced Burt Lum in the 1920s.

Her younger daughter Eleanor "Peter" Lum married the diplomat Sir Colin Tradescant Crowe and became an author. In 1936 her elder daughter Catherine married Antonio Riva, an Italian pilot during World War I who was executed in 1951 in Beijing for an alleged plot to assassinate Mao Zedong. Lum had been staying with Catherine at the time of Riva's arrest and was herself placed under house arrest.

In 1953 Lum left China and moved with Catherine to Genoa, Italy. She died in Genoa, Italy in February 1954.

== Gallery ==
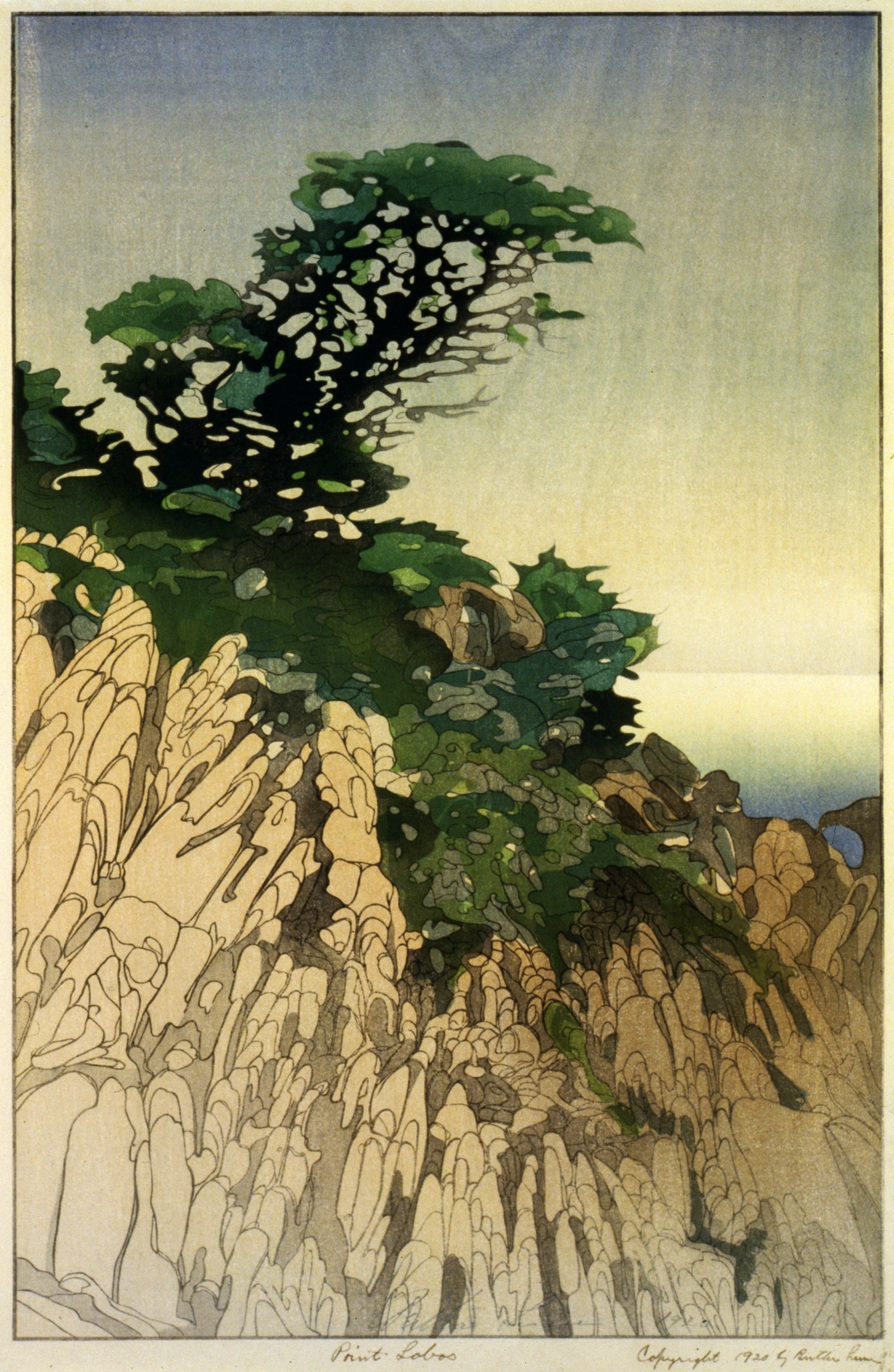
Point Lobos 1920

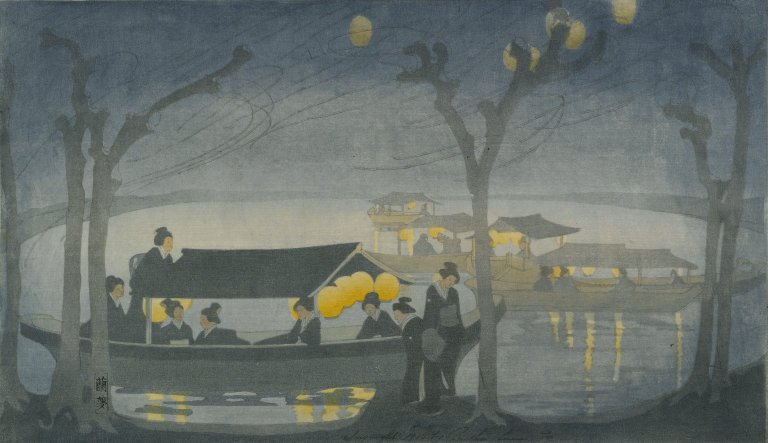
Brooklyn Museum - On the River - Bertha Lum

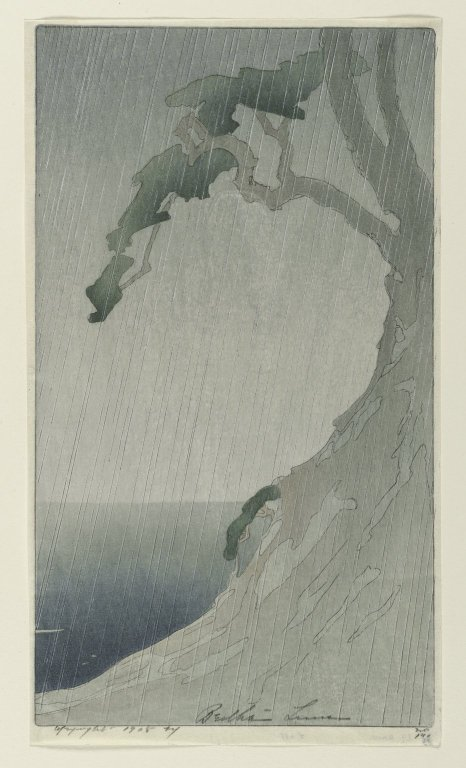
Brooklyn Museum - Rain - Bertha Lum

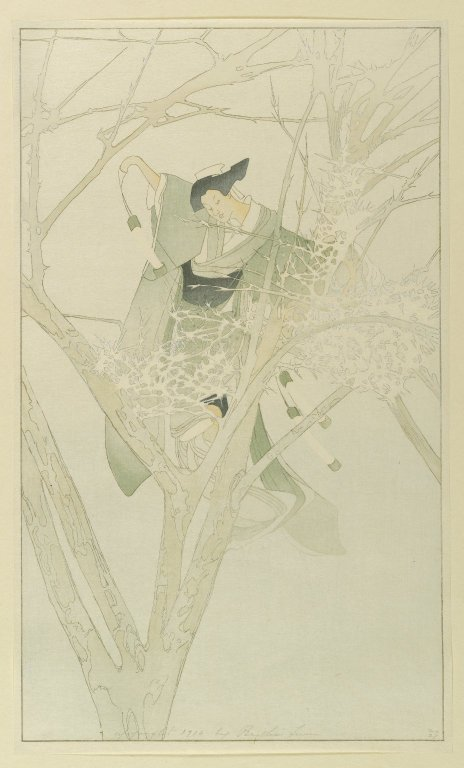
Brooklyn Museum - Yuki-Anna, The Frost Fairy - Bertha Lum

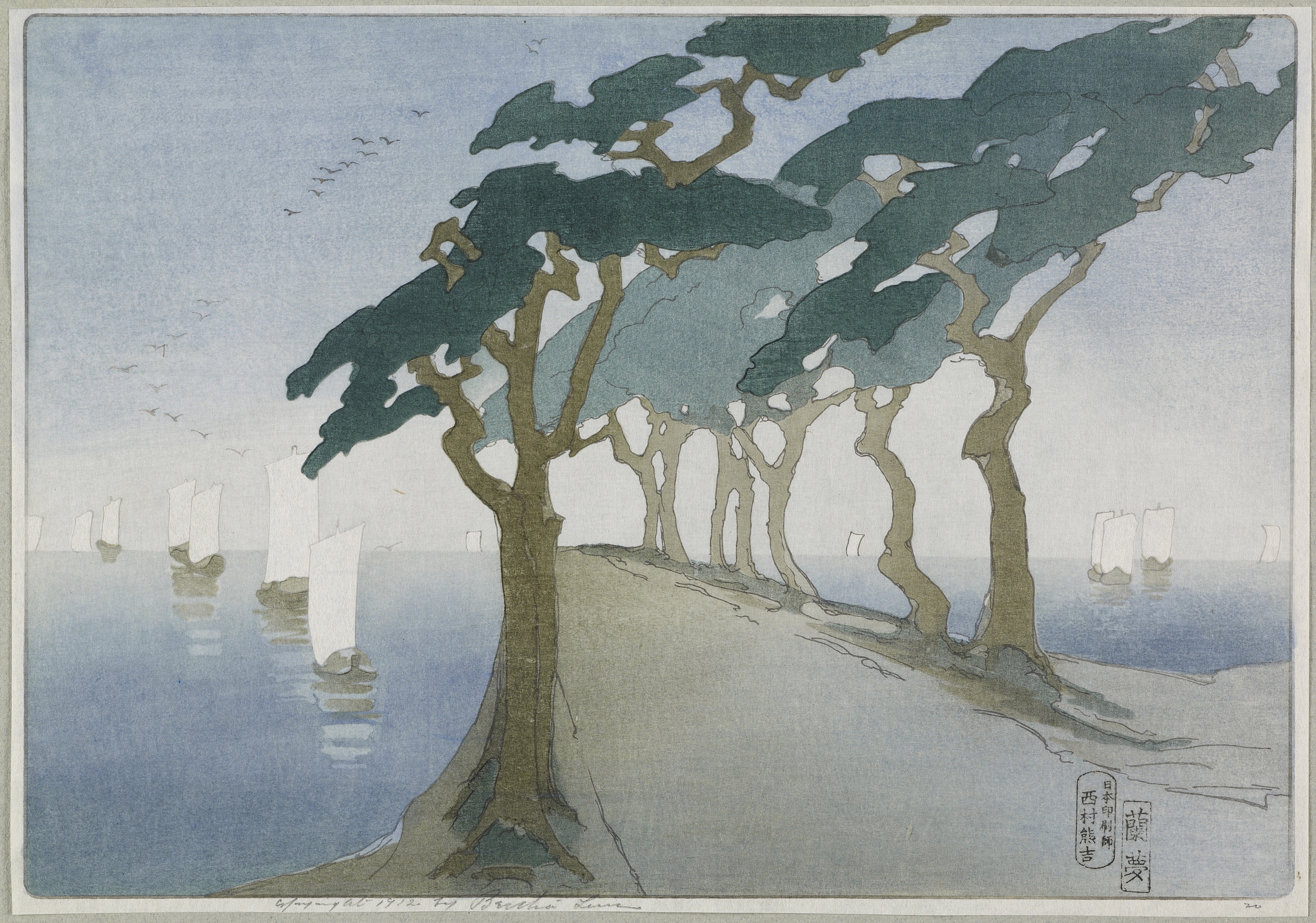
Bertha Lum, American, 1869 - 1954; Pines by the Sea; 1912; Color woodcut

== See also ==
Other western women who lived in Japan or China and made woodblock prints:

- Helen Hyde
- Katharine Jowett
- Elizabeth Keith
- Lilian May Miller
