= Homs (disambiguation) =

Homs (Arabic: حمص, romanized: Ḥimṣ) is a city in Syria.

Homs may also refer to:

- Homs Governorate, Syria
  - Homs District
- Homs Sanjak, administrative area of Syria within Ottoman Empire
- Lake Homs, an artificial lake upstream from Homs, in Syria
  - Lake Homs Dam, that created the lake
- Jund Homs, a district of medieval Syria
- Battle of Homs (disambiguation), the name of several battles
  - Siege of Homs
- Homs Camp, a Palestinian refugee camp in Homs
- Syriac Catholic Archeparchy of Homs
- Al-Khums (Arabic: الخمس), a city in Libya
- Al-Khums Governorate, a former governorate of Libya

== People with the surname ==
- Joaquim Homs (1906–2003), Spanish composer
- Francesc Homs Molist (born 1969), Spanish politician
- Ramón Homs (born 1974), Spanish alpine skier
- Alícia Homs Ginel (born 1993), Spanish politician
- Verónica Homs (fl. 2001–present), Spanish model

== See also ==
- Hims al-Andalus
- Hom (disambiguation)
