= Robert Holmes =

Robert Holmes may refer to:

== Law ==
- Robert Holmes (barrister) (1765–1859), Irish lawyer and nationalist
- Robert E. Holmes (1922–2004), Ohio state supreme court justice

== Politics ==
- Robert Holmes (Gloucestershire MP), elected in 1653
- Robert Holmes (Canadian politician) (1852–1932), Canadian Member of Parliament
- Robert D. Holmes (1909–1976), governor of Oregon
- Bob Holmes (politician) (born 1943), Georgia state legislator

== Sports ==
- Bob Holmes (footballer) (1867–1955), England & Preston North End footballer
- Bobby Holmes (1932–2026), Scottish footballer
- Robert Holmes (American football) (1945–2018), running back for the Kansas City Chiefs and Houston Oilers

== Other ==
- Robert Holmes (Royal Navy officer) (1622–1692), English admiral
- Robert Holmes (priest) (1748–1805), English Biblical scholar and Dean of Winchester
- Robert Holmes (engineer) (1856–1936), New Zealand civil engineer
- Robert Holmes (artist) (1861–1930), Canadian artist
- Robert H. Holmes (1888–1917), first NYPD African-American officer to die in the line of duty
- Robert Holmes (scriptwriter) (1926–1986), English TV scriptwriter
- Robert L. Holmes (born 1935), professor of philosophy at the University of Rochester
- Robert Holmes (musician) (born 1959), guitarist for the band 'Til Tuesday
- Bob Holmes (artist) (born 1963), British artist
- Robert Holmes (astronomer) (born 1956), American amateur astronomer

== See also ==
- Robert Holmes à Court (1937–1990), businessman
- Robert Holme (disambiguation)
