= Homs offensive =

Homs offensive may refer to the following:

- 2012 Homs offensive
- Homs offensive (November–December 2015)
- Eastern Homs offensive (2017)
- Northern Homs offensive (April–May 2018)
- 2024 Homs offensive

== See also ==
- Battle of Homs (disambiguation)
- Siege of Homs
