= Katsushika Ōi =

Japanese artist (c.1800-c.1866)

- 葛飾 応為
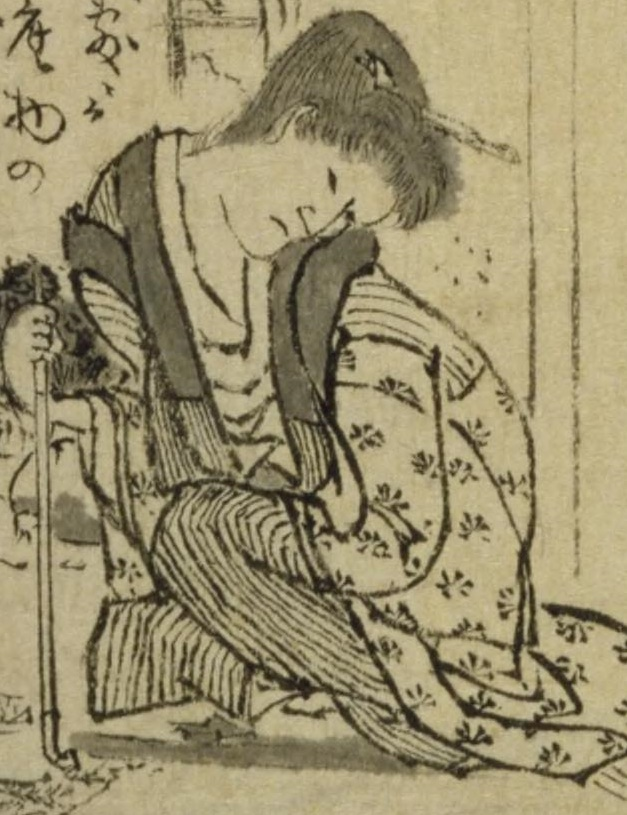
- Katsushika Ōi in the mid-1840s
- Born: c. 1800 (exact date unknown); Edo (present-day Tokyo), Japan
- Died: c. 1866 (exact date unknown)
- Known for: Ukiyo-e
- Father: Hokusai

Katsushika Ōi (葛飾 応為, c. 1800 – c. 1866), also known as Ei (栄; or O-Ei (お栄) with the honorific prefix) or Ei-jo (栄女; lit. 'woman Ei'), was a Japanese ukiyo-e artist of the early 19th century Edo period. She was a daughter of Hokusai from his second wife. Ōi was an accomplished painter who also worked as a production assistant to her father.

== Biography ==
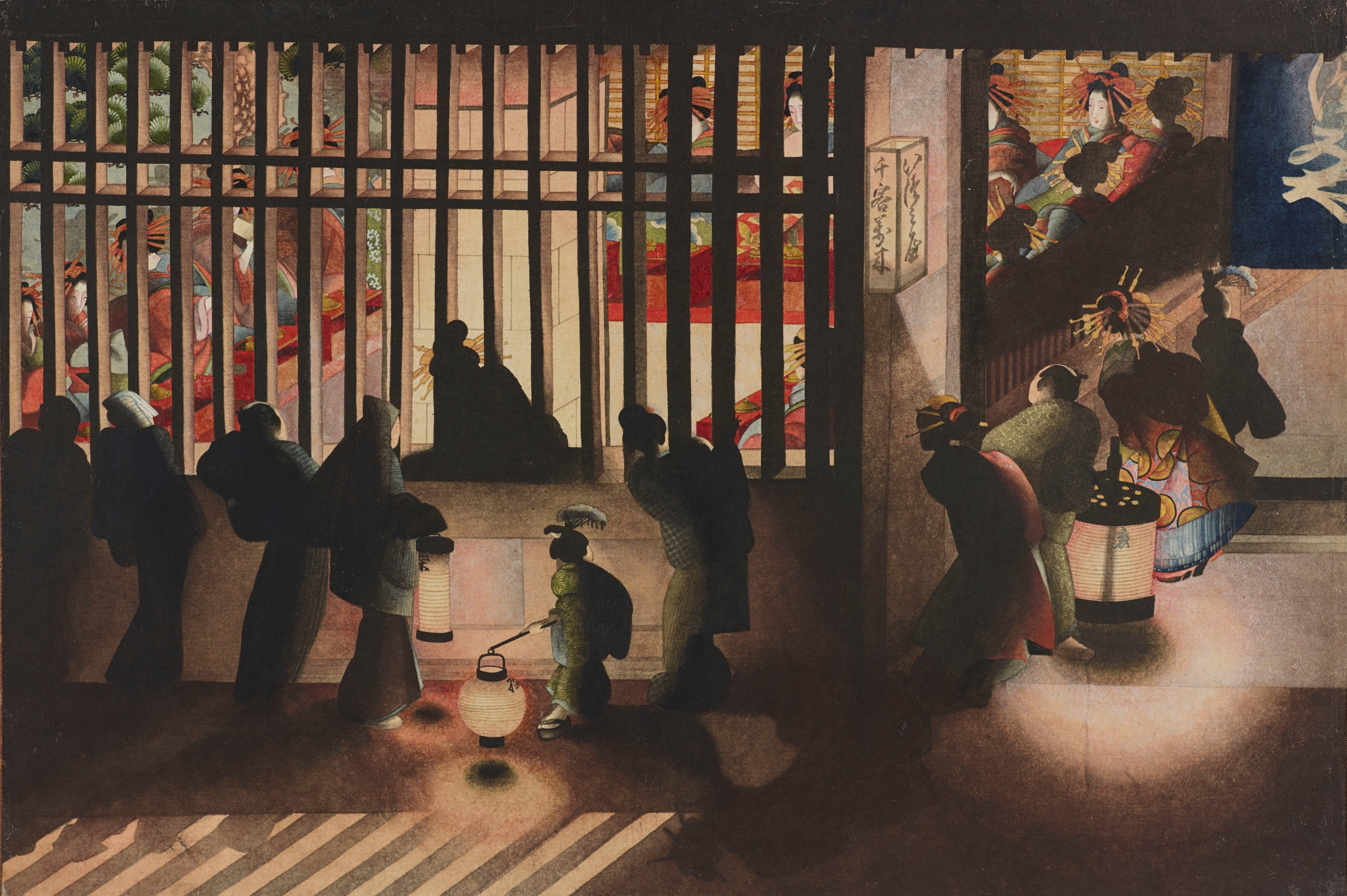
Nightscene in the Yoshiwara (吉原格子先之図) by Katsushika Ōi

Ōi's birth and death dates are not known, although it is believed that she was born in 1800 and died around 1866. She was a daughter of the ukiyo-e artist Katsushika Hokusai (1760–1849). Hokusai married twice; the first marriage (Note: It is not known whether Hokusai divorced his first wife or outlived her.) produced a son and two daughters, and the second, to a woman named Kotome (ことめ), resulted in a son and one or two daughters.

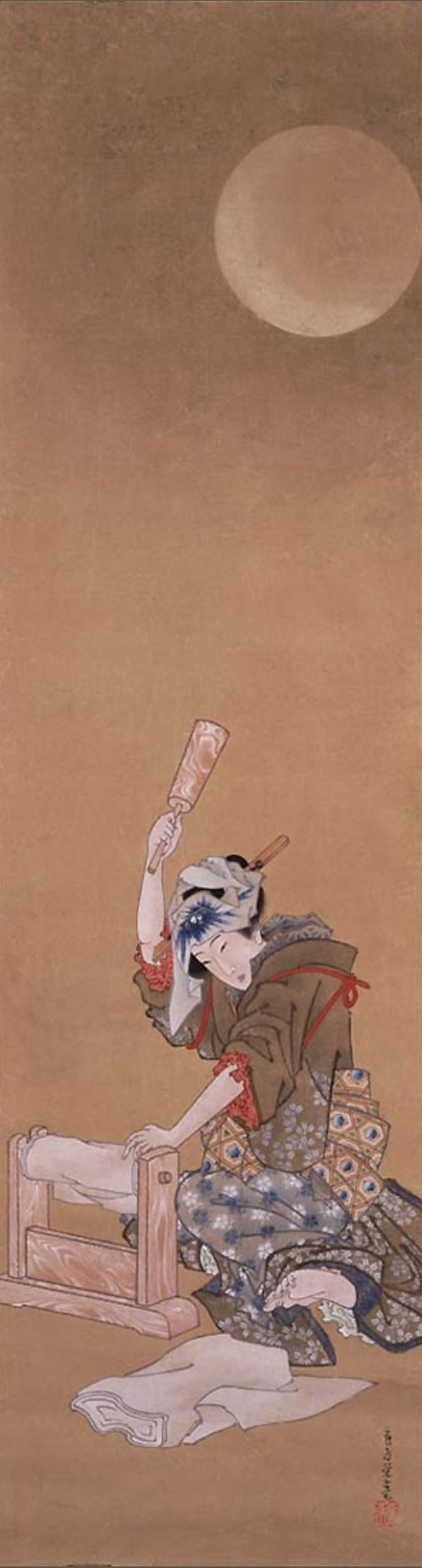
Kinuta or Beauty Fulling Cloth in the Moonlight (19th century Edo period) by Katsushika Ōi

Ōi studied her craft under her father's guidance as his apprentice. She also studied under Tsutsumi Torin III (1789–1830) who was a fellow painter and printmaker. This is where she met Minamizawa Tomei (also known as Tsutsumi Tōmei), another one of Tsutsumi Torin III's students, and married him in 1824. Their marriage did not last long, for only three years later they divorced. It is rumored that their marriage ended as a result of Ōi's criticism of Minamizawa Tomei's work, claiming he was a terrible artist, and laughing at him for it. Ōi thereafter went to live with her father again, and assisted Hokusai with his artwork, and took to producing her own as well. In 1828, Kotome, Ōi's mother died, leaving her to care for her now sixty year old father. Neither of them cared about housework or maintaining their home, with all their time occupied by their work, both of them painting and printmaking alongside one another in an unkempt household. Despite her father's fame, Ōi too managed to make a name for herself. In Hokusai's family, his daughters were expected to tend to their father and assist him in his workshop until they were married off and required to tend to their own husbands. While Ōi's sisters, Miyo, Tatsu, and Nao, all suffered this fate, Ōi never remarried, allowing her to move back in and work on her craft.

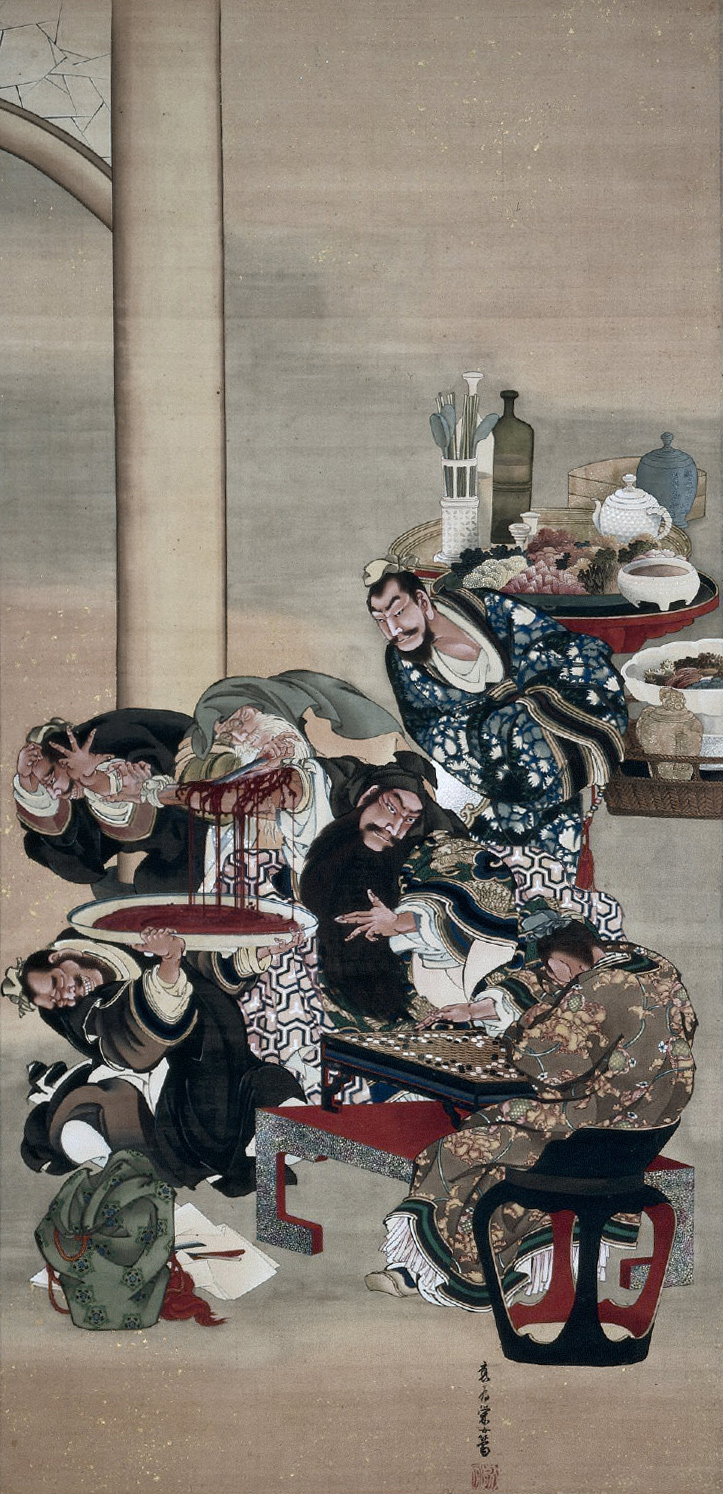
Operating on Guan Yu's Arm

Hokusai himself noted his daughters' talent when it came to depicting beautiful women; other artists at the time such as Keisai Eisen regarded her as accomplished, for despite being a woman, Ōi garnered a reputation as a skillful artist after her father.

== Works ==
Ōi is known to have excelled at handwriting and in bijin-ga paintings of beautiful women. The following is a selected list of her works.

- Kinuta or Beauty Fulling Cloth in the Moonlight (date unknown) – Painting on paper. Tokyo National Museum collection.
- Yoshiwara Night Scene (date unknown) – The parts of her name can be observed in this scene, distributed over three different lanterns tagged with symbols "O", "i", and "Ei". Ukiyo-e Ōta Memorial Museum of Art collection.
- Kuruwa in Grid View (date unknown) – Ukiyo-e Ōta Memorial Museum of Art collection.
- Beauty of Spring Night (date unknown) – Menard Art Museum collection.
- Hundred Eyes (date unknown) – Hokusai Museum collection.
- Mount Fuji through a Bamboo Forest (date unknown) – Hanging scroll; ink and color on silk. Hokusai Museum collection.
- Three Women Playing Musical Instruments (c. 1818–1844, i.e. Bunsei to Tenpō era) – Hanging scroll; ink and color on silk. Museum of Fine Arts, Boston, collection.
- Operating on Guan Yu's Arm (c. 1818–1854) – Hanging scroll; ink, color and gold leaf on silk. – Cleveland Museum of Art collection.
- One Thousand Years of Hyakunin isshu Yamato Longevity (1829) – Pictorial.

She has also been credited as an illustrator for the following books.

- Illustrated Handbook for Daily Life for Women (1847) – Woodblock printed book. Ravicz Collection.
- A Concise Dictionary of Sencha (1848)

Aside from drawing and painting, Ōi also made keshi ningyō dolls and sold them to earn a living.

== Legacy ==
Few of Ōi's works are known: amongst them, a few nikuhitsu-ga paintings, the illustrations to the book Onna Chōhō-ki (女重宝記, 1847) by Takai Ranzan (高井 蘭山), and no prints.

Canadian novelist Katherine Govier wrote a first-person novel about Ōi titled The Ghost Brush (2010, also titled The Printmaker's Daughter).

The story of Ōi was adapted to comics as Miss Hokusai (1983–1987), which had an animated movie adaptation in 2015. The story tells of the outspoken O-Ei, daughter of the famed artist Tetsuzō (Hokusai), for whom she sometimes paints uncredited. The film won numerous awards.

Makate Asai based her novel Kurara on the life of Ōi; it was published in 2016 after serialization in 2014–15, and an NHK television adaptation of it titled Kurara: Hokusai no Musume ("Kurara: Hokusai's Daughter") appeared in 2017, starring Aoi Miyazaki.

== See also ==
- List of women ukiyo-e and shin-hanga artists

== Bibliography ==
- Hanrahan, Catherine (2010-05-28). "Review: Fiction: Under the Great Wave". The Globe and Mail.
- Kamiya, Hiroshi (2006). "Katsushika Ōi". In Kobayashi, Tadashi (ed.). Ukiyo eshi retsuden 浮世絵師列伝. Bessatsu Taiyō (in Japanese). Heibonsha. p. 116. ISBN 978-4-582-94493-8.
- Suzuki, Yukiko (2016). Ukiyo-e no Onna-tachi 浮世絵の女たち [Women of Ukiyo-e] (in Japanese). Gentosha. ISBN 978-4-344-02950-7.
- Tanabe, Kunio Francis (2011-12-26). "Book World: Art and artifice in Katherine Govier's Printmaker's Daughter". The Washington Post.
