= Katharine Jowett =

English artist of Beijing cityscapes (1882–1972)

- Born: Catharine Alice Wheatley; 1882; Banbury, Oxfordshire
- Died: 1972 (aged 89–90); Okehampton, Devon
- Known for: Woodcut cityscapes of Beijing
- Style: shin-hanga

Katharine Alice Jowett née Wheatley (1882–1972) was a British artist, best known for her cityscapes of Beijing in the early to mid-20th century. Along with Bertha Lum and other émigré European and American artists in China, she was a proponent of the shin-hanga style of woodcut printing. Mao Zedong was said to have appreciated and collected her art.

== Early life ==
Jowett was born in Oxfordshire in 1882, the daughter of a Methodist Minister. Until after her marriage she spelt her Christian name Catherine or Catharine. In her late teens, she fell in love with a missionary and followed him to China. During her sojourn in Hubei and Hunan provinces, she decided that a missionary life didn't suit her, and she moved to Beijing, where she met and married Hardy Jowett (1871-1936) in 1910. For their honeymoon, they took a trip to England via Japan and Canada, a harrowing journey that involved a near shipwreck.

Jowett had two sons, Christopher and Edward. Some time after 1920, the family moved back to China where her husband took on the management of the Beijing office of the Asiatic Petroleum Company. In 1930, Christopher - then a student at Stroud - was arrested en route to Beijing at the Sino-Soviet border. He'd lost his passport and was incarcerated for a fortnight.

== Career ==
Jowett volunteered at the Peiping Institute of Fine Arts, where her husband was on the board. It organised exhibitions and lessons in the arts, its ball was an annual high point of social life amongst the city's foreigners. At this point, Jowett had mainly been producing watercolours and oils, but through the institute's exhibitions, she was introduced to the shin-hanga technique and began to create woodcuts.

Along with Bertha Lum, Jowett exhibited at various centres in Beijing. While Lum had learned shin-hanga in Yokohama, Jowett never studied in Japan, and appears to have absorbed the techniques from Lum's studio. Jowett didn't consider herself a professional artist, keeping away from publicity and the press, and only began to sell her work under Lum's guidance. Lum introduced her to Helen Burton, an American who owned The Camel's Bell, an art gallery, who acted as her representative in promoting and selling her works.

Jowett produced detailed studies of Beijing's architectural beauties. Among others, she painted the Temple of Heaven, the Qianmen Gate and the watchtowers and pagodas of the Forbidden City. Some of her works are rumoured to have been the only Western art pieces to be displayed in Mao Zedong's personal chambers.

A number of her works were acquired in 1940 by Robert O. Muller, a prolific collector of Asian art. Beijing was on the "Eastern Grand Tour", visited by wealthy American and European connoisseurs. Visiting the Camel's Bell, they would have found her woodcuts displayed as main attractions. Indeed, Jowett appears to have produced many of her works for the tourist market.

Jowett's Catalogue raisonné has not been compiled. Frequently, her works have appeared at auction. One estimate suggests she produced several dozen woodcuts; she also created numbered editions for private collections.

== Later life ==
Jowett's husband died in 1936. By this time, their sons were both in England. Jowett stayed on in Beijing, not leaving even during the Japanese occupation which started in 1937. She was arrested as an enemy national and remanded to the Weihsien Civilian Internment Camp in 1943. Released in 1945, she came back to England to stay near her younger son. She maintained her artistic output of local landscapes.

Katharine Jowett died on 10 December 1972 in Okehampton, Devon.
