= Lilian May Miller =

American artist (1895–1943)

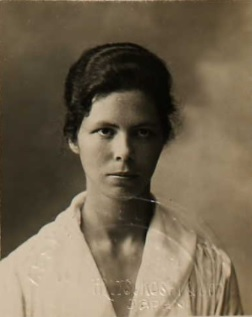
- Lilian May Miller, passport photo, 1918
- Born: 20 July 1895; Tokyo, Japan
- Died: 11 January 1943 (aged 47); San Francisco, United States
- Education: Kano Tomonobu (Kanō school, Tokyo), Shimada Bokusen
- Known for: Drawing, Painting, Watercolor painting, Printmaking, Woodblock printing, Poetry

Lilian May Miller (July 20, 1895 – January 11, 1943) was an American painter, woodblock printmaker and poet born in Tokyo, Japan. In the world of art she marked her place with imagery, while she attended presentations in traditional kimonos, and signed her paintings with a monogram.

She practiced oil painting, watercolor painting, book illustrations, photography, and printing. Trained in Japan in traditional painting styles and techniques, Lilian May Miller created lyrical sketches, ink paintings and woodblock prints representing people and landscapes from Japan and Korea, the countries where she spent most of her life.

== Personal life ==
=== Early life and education ===
Lilian May Miller was born in Tokyo, Japan, on July 20, 1895. Her father, Ransford Miller (1867–1932), was an American diplomat who had worked for the YMCA in Tokyo from 1890 to 1894. (Note: Ransford Miller was born in Ithaca, New York. In 1888 he received his Bachelor of Arts Degree from Cornell University. From 1885 to 1888, he taught Greek at the Ithaca High School and was the Cornell University Christian Association General Secretary from 1888 to 1890.) From 1895 to 1909 he was a legation interpreter. In 1894 Ransford Miller married Lilly Murray, who had arrived in Japan in 1888 (Note: Lilly Murray was born on November 9, 1864, in Lyons, New York. She married Rawson S. Miller and lived in Japan from 1888 to 1909; she lived in Korea from 1914 to 1918. In October 1919 she accompanied her husband, who was born in New York State, Consul General to Japan. They were living in Washington D.C. at the time.) and taught English. Lilian had a sister named Harriet, who her father called "Hal"; Lilian was called "Jack".

In 1904, at the suggestion of well known etcher and engraver Helen Hyde (1868–1919), Ransford Miller enrolled nine-year-old Lilian in the atelier of Kanō Tomonobu (1843–1912), who was the 9th generation head of the famous Kanō school in Tōkyō. Three years later she exhibited her first works. Her distinct gô (art name) that she used as her professional name was Gyokka which means jeweled flower.

When she was in her teens her father became head of the State Department's Far Eastern Department was transferred back to Washington, D.C., and for the first time she left Japan and went to the United States. Miller attended the Central High School in Washington, D.C., and at the age of 14 won first prize for a Washington Post art contest with Early Morning in Old Japan. She went to Vassar College in New York, attended the college during part of the time writer and professor Sophia Chen Zen studied there, and she was a classmate of poet Edna St. Vincent Millay. She graduated with honors in 1917.

=== Adulthood ===
Then she went to Seoul, Korea in 1918, where her father was now the American Consul General. She was a journalist and secretary at the State Department in Washington, D.C. Miller then lived with her parents in New York and worked at the Consular Service. She was a clerk and confidential secretary at the American embassy in 1920. After a brief period at the State Department, she returned to Tokyo in 1920.

She was in financial ruin after the Great Kanto earthquake of September 1, 1923, when many of her prints and paintings were destroyed. Miller lived with her parents in Seoul, Korea from 1923 until 1927 or 1928. While in Korea, Miller made prints and recuperated over a long period of time from a serious illness. In 1930 Miller returned to Japan and moved to Kyoto. Her father returned to the U.S. and became head of the Far Eastern Department in the State Department, Washington. He died in 1932 and his remains were buried at Yokohama Foreign Cemetery.

In 1935, Miller had surgery for a large cancerous tumor and a hysterectomy. In early 1936, after a political imbroglio in which Japanese radical officers assassinated several leading politicians, Miller and her mother left Japan and moved to Honolulu, Hawaii. In the autumn of 1938 she moved to San Francisco and she began to include the massive redwoods and cedars of California in her work. In her personal life she hiked California's San Gabriel Mountains and wandered through Alaska.

She lived a life of contradictions. Miller wore kimonos when she showed her work – which reflected her east Asian upbringing – but also wore men's clothes and called herself "Jack". The kimono represented the Japanese traditional culture in which she was raised, but she didn't follow the strict protocols for developing wood block printing, this was something that made her popular with Americans. Her parents were from the United States, but she lived most of her life in Asia. She is assumed to have been a lesbian and once said that she didn't have the ability to make herself fall in love with a man.

Following the Japanese attack on Pearl Harbor in December 1941, she destroyed much of her woodprint works, having felt betrayed by Japan. During the war, Miller worked against the Japanese. She signed on with a Naval counter propaganda branch as a Japanese censor and research analyst. On December 9, 1942, she had surgery to remove a large malignant tumor at a hospital at Stanford University. She died on January 11, 1943, of abdominal cancer in California. (Note: Guliver stated that she lived in Honolulu until her death.) Her ashes were buried at Woodlawn Cemetery in San Francisco, California.

== Art ==
=== Painting ===
After her Vassar graduation, she returned to Japan to study from 1917 to 1918 with Shimada Bokusen. While in Tokyo, Miller received recognition for her ink painting of Queen Min's Gyeongbok Palace pavilion entitled In a Korean Palace Garden in 1920. She received an award at the Japanese Imperial Salon for the work.

In the 1930s, during the Great Depression, Miller evolved to a new style of popular watercolor painting. She made over 100 watercolor paintings, usually working outdoors.

=== Woodblock printing ===
The paradox of her situation was that in Japan she was a foreigner trying to keep a traditional art alive, while in America she was trying to convey the 'beautiful spirit of Asia' in a land of industrialisation. In America, particularly with at gallery shows or for newspaper photographers, she adopted a 'Japanese' identity, wearing a kimono, but was of course an Anglo-American woman of social standing. In this sense she served as part of a tableau of the Oriental, on display in galleries along with her pictures.

— Katrina Gulliver,
Modern Women in China and Japan

Miller made Shin-hanga woodblock prints, a 20th-century version of traditional Ukiyo-e prints, or pictures of the floating world, which were popular beginning in the 1700s. Because they were prints they were readily available and inexpensive artworks. Edmond and Jules de Goncourt created greater interest in Japanese work as an art form in the late 19th century, partly through Edmond's books Outamaro and Hokousai. They first identified the cultural movement of Japonisme. Of the western women who began making shin-hanga wood prints, or "creative prints", Miller was the only one born in the orient. The others, who had all lived in Japan, were Helen Hyde, who first made the Japanese prints in 1901, Elizabeth Keith and Bertha Lum. The shin-hanga prints included scenes from the contemporary world, like western dress and electricity.

Woodblock print production was traditionally a team effort, led by the artist's direction. Several woodblocks were cut from the artist's sketch and watercolor painting, each woodblock for a specific color. Then a printer would make prints by pressing the woodblock with its associated colored ink onto paper. Miller did the work herself, creating the initial image and woodcuts and making the prints.

In September 1920 she turned to woodblock printing, creating images of Korean people and countryside, which she sold in Tōkyō and the United States. She was living as the tenant of the artist and promoter Bertha B. Lum (1869–1954). Miller began to work with the block-carver Matsumoto, who had previously worked for Helen Hyde, and the printer Nishimura Kumakichi (1861 – ca. 1941), whom Bertha Lum relied on for her own print productions. Shortly thereafter there was a dramatic falling-out between the two artists. Miller also struggled with a relationship with Elizabeth Keith, who began as a friend but later developed into a rival. From 1920, she made her living as a printmaker. The images, mostly of scenes of Korean life, were sold in Tokyo, Seoul, large American cities, Shanghai, and Peking. Many of Miller's prints were produced on postcards.

On September 1, 1923, Tōkyō was largely destroyed by the Great Kantō earthquake, including most of Miller's paintings and prints. Miller was in Korea from 1923 to 1927. During that time she produced more stylized prints. Miller made prints of domestic scenes, like children at play or women hanging laundry. One of her prints, A Strange Scene in Korea, depicted a woman carrying a baby on her back with a basket over her head. Another is entitled, Korean Farm House under the Moonlight with a man talking to a woman with a basket over her head.

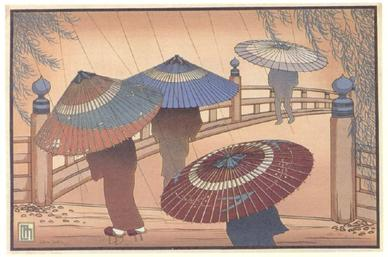
Lilian May Miller, Rain Blossoms, color woodprint, 1928

In Rain Blossoms that Miler made in 1928, the colorful umbrellas, or 'blossoms', are contrasted against the plain background of the people's bodies. Willow trees and the bridge are traditional Oriental motifs. It is considered a "beautiful example of Miller's work". Other prints were Nikko Gateway, Makaen Monastery and Festival of Lanterns. Most of her works were scenes of Japan.

Lilian made a six-month visit to the United States in 1929 and 1930 and gave woodblock printing demonstrations at galleries and museums in Boston, New York City, Philadelphia, Washington, Chicago, Kansas City, Denver, San Francisco, and Pasadena. During her lectures, exhibitions and one-woman shows, she wore an elaborate kimono. Miller was admired for her ability to execute the entire woodblock printing process, including the block-cutting stage, by herself. Her works were then in the collections of the Art Institute of Chicago and the British Museum. In the 1937 exhibition of the Honolulu Print Makers, she exhibited a print depicting bamboo using a lithotint method, a kind of lithography, that achieved the effect of ink painting. It was entitled A Spray of Bamboo and won the sixth annual gift print prize.

=== Female patrons and collectors ===
She had a network of key female art patrons and admirers of the time, including Empress Nagako of Japan; Lou Henry Hoover, the wife of U.S. president Herbert Hoover; Anne Morrow Lindbergh, aviator and spouse of famous Charles Lindbergh; and Grace Nicholson, a renowned Pasadena art dealer. It was Nicholson's Pasadena residence, now the Pacific Asia Museum, where Miller perhaps felt most at home—outside Japan. Their friendship enabled Miller to meet and make use of many important art contacts on her American trip and afterwards.

=== Collections ===
Her work Moonlight on Mt. Fuji, Japan is in the collections of the Smithsonian American Art Museum.

== Poetry ==
In 1927, Miller published a revised version of her poetry book Grass Blades from a Cinnamon Garden, which was illustrated with her woodcut prints. Author Kendall H. Brown stresses the visual quality of many of the poems, and concludes that while "her poetry was often flat and contrived, her art was becoming increasingly radiant and natural." A number of the poems in the volume are ardent expressions of love addressed, it seems, to women, and Brown remarked: "The feminized Orient, alternately maternal and sexual, is easily linked to the desired lover who is at once the gentle teacher and the object of amorous desire. Thus, the Orient becomes the lover and the lover becomes the Orient, both ideal states of grace and sites of feminine creativity."

== Posthumous recognition ==
Miller's paintings and prints, as well as those of Bertha Lum, Elizabeth Keith and Helen Hyde, were exhibited in the June 2012 show "Visions of the Orient" of 125 paintings and prints at the Schnitzer Museum of Art at the University of Oregon. Each of the women lived in Asia from 1900 to 1940, made woodblock prints in Japan and were trained painters.

In 2015, an exhibit of 70 works from the Gana Foundation for Arts and Culture made by Miller, Elizabeth Keith, Bertha Lum, Yoshida Hiroshi, Paul Jacoulet, and Willy Selier was held from February to March 1 at Gana Insa Art Center in Seoul.

== Publications ==
- Lilian Miller (1927). Grass Blades from a Cinnamon Garden. Tokyo, Japan: Japan Advertiser Press. OCLC 3625943. Woodblock print illustrations by the author.
- Joan S Grigsby (1935). The Orchid Door - Ancient Korean Poems. Kobe, Japan: J.L. Thompson & Company. OCLC 3785603. Illustrated by Lilian Miller.
- Lilian Miller. Selected Poems by Wood Block Artist Lilian Miller. Tiburon, California: Catherine Coffin Phillips Library. OCLC 688334708.

== See also ==
Other western women who lived in Japan and made woodprints

- Helen Hyde
- Bertha Lum
