= Hom-e Khosrow =

Hom-e Khosrow خم خسرو
- Village
- Location within Iran
- Coordinates: 34°18′53″N 48°00′36″E
- Country: Iran
- Province: Hamadan
- County: Nahavand
- Bakhsh: Khezel
- Rural District: Khezel-e Sharqi

Population (2006)
  - Total: 127
- Time zone: UTC+3:30 (IRST)
  - Summer (DST): UTC+4:30 (IRDT)

Hom-e Khosrow (Persian: خم خسرو, also Romanized as Ḩom-e Khosrow; also known as Khom-e Khosrow and Khum-e Khosrow) is a village in Khezel-e Sharqi Rural District, Khezel District, Nahavand County, Hamadan Province, Iran. At the 2006 census, its population was 127, in 31 families.
