= Battle of Homs =

The Battle of Homs (or Battle of Hims) may refer to:

- First Battle of Homs (1260)
- Second Battle of Homs (1281)
- Third Battle of Homs (1299)
- Battle of Hims (1832)
- Siege of Homs (2011–2014)
  - 2012 Homs offensive
- 2024 Homs offensive

== See also ==
- Homs offensive (disambiguation)
- Battle of Emesa (272)
- Siege of Emesa (636)
- Battle of Marj al-Saffar, Spring 1303
