= Robert Holme =

Robert Holme may refer to:

- Robert Holme (aviator) (1896–1922), British flying ace of World War I
- Robert Holme (died 1433), MP for City of York
- Robert Holme (died 1449), MP for Kingston upon Hull (UK Parliament constituency)

== See also ==
- Bob Holme (born 1969), American ski jumper
- Robert Holmes (disambiguation)
