= Verónica Homs =

Spanish model and presenter

Verónica Homs (born 5 May 1980) is a Spanish model and television personality who works in Peru.

== Biography ==
Homs was born in Tenerife, Canary Islands, Spain on 5 May 1980.

In the year 2001, Homs was elected Miss Tenerife and then she won the title of Miss Interviú, a spanish magazine where Homs was twice on the cover. Homs appeared on the 2002 calendar of Interviú and on the 2004 issue with five other Miss Interviú winners.

Homs collaborated during four years in the program El Expreso on Televisión Canaria Channel.

For love, she left for Peru where she continued her career.

She worked as reporter until February 2011 in the TV program: Enemigos Públicos.

In October 2011, she stopped to work in the program Lima Limón. She preferred to be a reporter. A few days later she began to work in a new program: La Noche es Mía.

In December 2011, Homs was cover of the magazine SoHo.

In April 2012, she was signed by the channel Panamericana Televisión. She presented during the noon the program: 24 Horas and on Saturdays she collaborated with the News programme El Panamericano. In those two programs, she worked only six months because of the TV channel´s economic problems.

=== Family life ===
On 15 March 2012 Homs married Argentinian manager Christian Fernández.

On 23 April 2014 their first daughter, Ainhoa, was born.
