= Homme Lake =

Man-made lake in North Dakota, U.S.

- Location within North Dakota Location within the United States
- Location: North Dakota, United States
- Coordinates: 48°24′12″N 97°47′31″W
- Type: Reservoir
- Basin countries: United States
- Average depth: 10 ft (3.0 m)
- Max. depth: 34 ft (10 m)
- Surface elevation: 1,053 ft (321 m)

Homme Lake, or Homme Reservoir, is a man-made lake, located west of Park River, North Dakota, that contains walleye, crappie and northern pike. Several species of minnows also live in Homme that include fathead, creek chub, etc. Homme has a maximum depth of 34 feet (10 m) with an average depth of 10 feet (3.0 m).

Homme Lake is named in honor of Mr. H.G. Homme, a prominent real estate investor and business person from Grafton, who was a committed advocate of the project. H.G. Homme is musician Joshua Homme's great grandfather.

The lake was made by the United States Army Corps of Engineers, who still operate some land around it, while the city operates the facilities. The land outside the dam is also accessible for hunting and picnicking.
