= Hom (instrument) =

Class of Mayan trumpet-like musical wind instruments

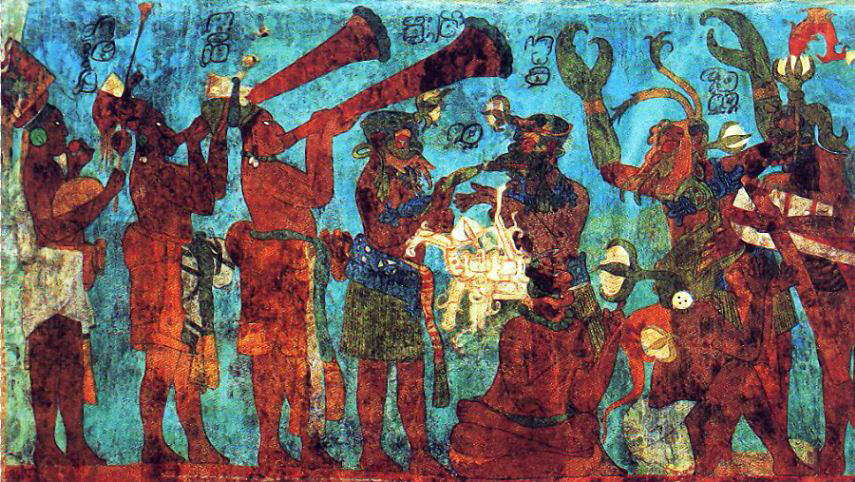
Hom-tahs in Bonampak mural

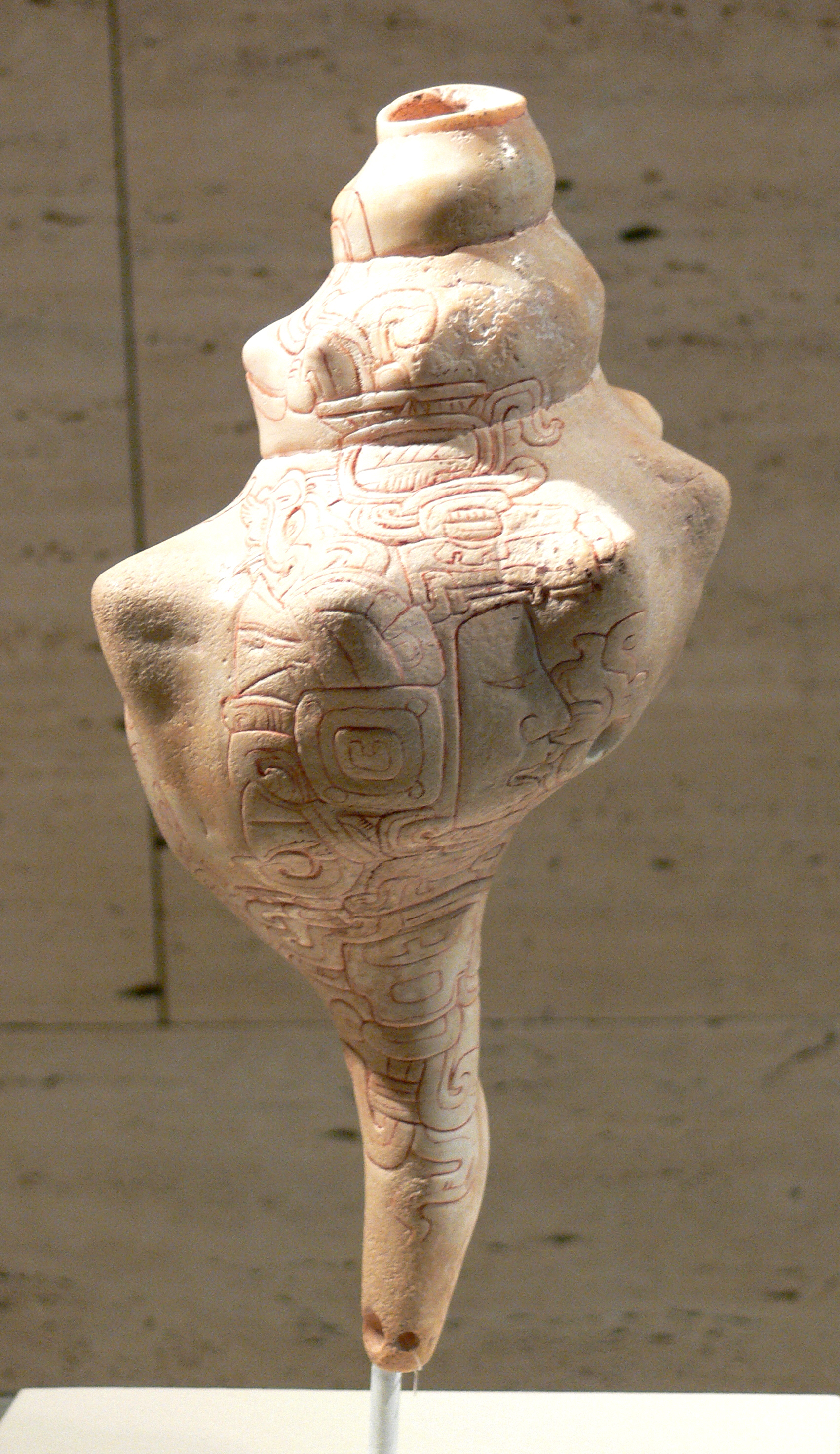
Maya Conch Shell Trumpet

Hom is a Yucatec Maya name used for a class of trumpet-like musical wind instruments found in pre-Columbian and traditional music among the Maya peoples of Mesoamerica. These may be gourd trumpets, horns, megaphones, bugles (cornetas), bocinas or sacabuches, and are seen depicted on the Bonampak murals. Most conspicuous are the hom-tahs or large horns, made from wood, clay and gourds.

Conch shells were also used as hom. A small hole was drilled at the apex of the shell's spire, through which the musician blew. Many Maya conch trumpets had three ventages to produce a series of notes. Decorative bands were often incised around the shell.

== See also ==
- Pre-Columbian Maya music
