= John Francis Holme =

American artist and printer

John Francis Holme (June 29, 1868–July 27, 1904), known professionally as Frank Holme, was an American newspaper artist and book printer. He is best known for his news illustrations, beginning with his work for the Pittsburgh Press when he covered the 1889 Johnstown flood.

Born in Corinth, West Virginia, he married Ida Van Dyke in 1893, around the same time he moved to Chicago. He made a name for himself as the illustrator at the Chicago Post, the Chicago Chronicle and the Chicago Daily News in part because of the speed at which he completed illustrations at the scene of news events. He founded the School of Illustration in Chicago which trained journalists to represent current events through chalk-plate, pen-and-ink and greased crayon illustrations. His illustrations were displayed in three different exhibitions at the Art Institute of Chicago.

Holme created the Bandar Log Press in 1895, which published books such as Just For Fun, Swanson, Able Seaman, and Strenuous Lad’s Library. He briefly lived in Phoenix, Arizona, in an effort to treat tuberculosis, but after a relapse, attempted to relocate to Denver, where he died in 1904.
