= Elizabeth Keith =

Scottish artist (1887–1956)

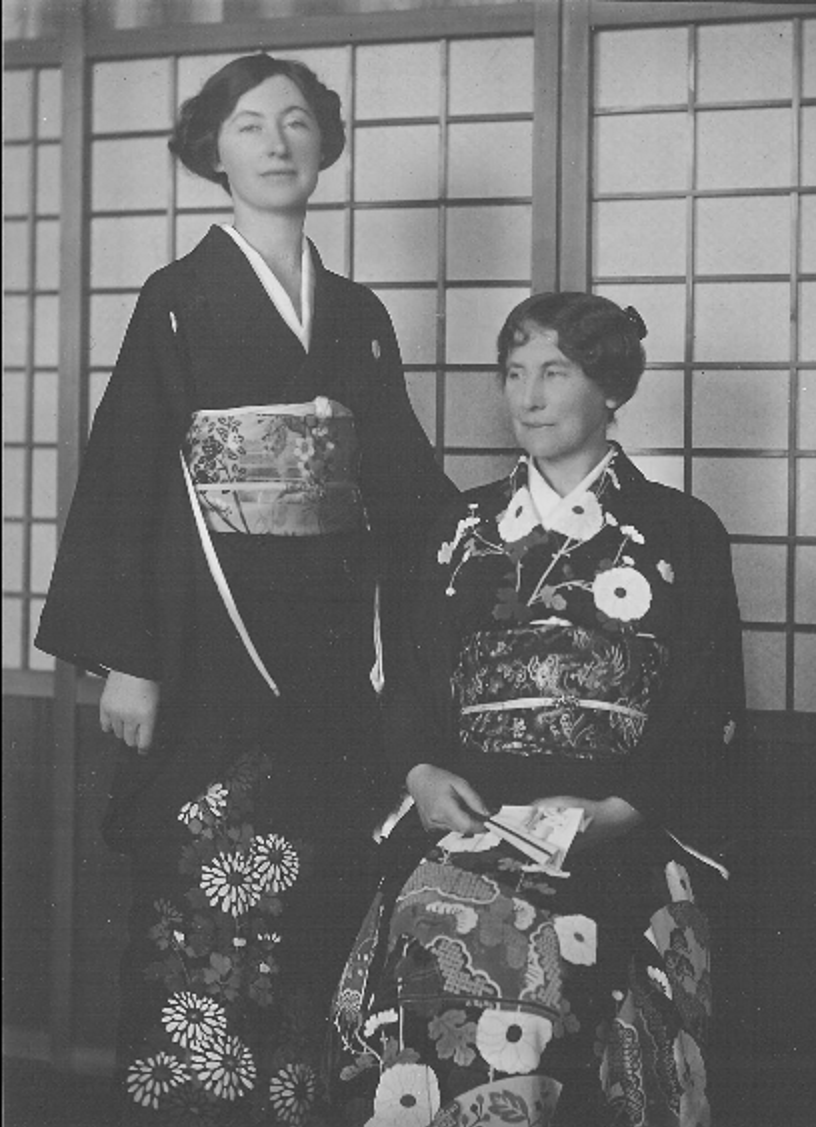
- Elizabeth Keith (left) with sister
- Born: 30 April 1887; Aberdeenshire, Scotland
- Died: 1956 (aged 68–69); London, England
- Occupation: Artist

Elizabeth Keith (30 April 1887 – 1956) was a Scottish artist and writer. She was a print-maker and watercolorist whose works were significantly influenced by her travels to Japan, China, Korea and the Philippines.

== Early life ==
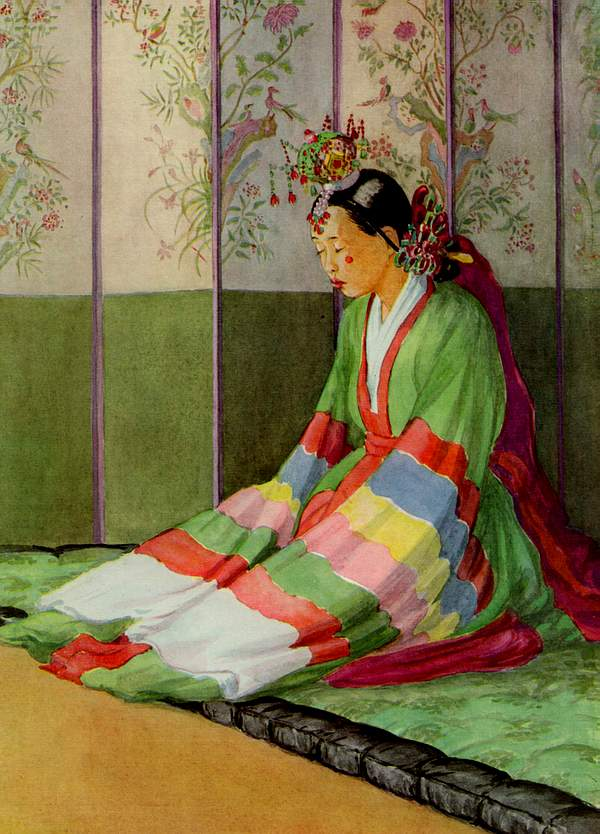
"Korean Bride" from Old Korea: the Land of Morning Calm, by Elizabeth Keith and Elspet Keith Robertson Scott, 1946.

Keith was born in Aberdeenshire, Scotland. She was a cousin to Sir Arthur Keith. It is uncertain, however, if Keith was born in 1887 or 1888.

== Career ==
Keith's work consists of prints depicting Asian life and culture, a fascination she acquired when she travelled to Tokyo at the age of 28 and remained there for nine years. She had gone to Tokyo in 1915 to visit her younger sister Elspet, who had married the editor J. W. Robertson-Scott, and what was meant to be a holiday became a nine-year stay. In her first year in Japan, she had a small exhibition with caricatures of foreign residents in Tokyo, which she published as a book benefiting the Red Cross entitled Grin and Bear It. From a trip to Korea she brought some watercolors back and exhibited them in Tokyo—she claimed it was "the first exhibition of Korean subjects ever held there." Watanabe Shōzaburō, the Shin-hanga publisher saw her exhibition and convinced Keith to transform one into a woodblock print - a view of the East Gate in Seoul.

Keith would continue her travels throughout Asia, visiting China, Korea, and the Philippines, gathering more subjects for her artwork. She learned the methods of traditional Japanese woodblock printing, emulating the work of Katsushika Hokusai, Ando Hiroshige, and Kitagawa Utamaro. Keith’s work gained popularity not only in Japan, but also in London and New York. Landscapes, people in traditional and common dress, and cultural rituals were central to her imagery. She also created portrait prints in the vein of a Chinese painted portrait tradition called xingle tu or "pleasure portraits."

In 1924 Keith returned to Britain where she started to learn colour etching techniques, and in 1925 began to print her own works, using an initial seal "in the oriental manner" to sign them. In 1928, she published an illustrated travel diary of her time in Asia called Eastern Windows. Among her colour etchings, The Chinese Matriarch (1934), based on a 1919 watercolour study, was issued in an edition of only twenty-five. Keith was back in Asia and Japan from 1929 to 1932, then again in 1934—in between these visits she was elected a Fellow of the Royal Society of Arts in London.

In 1936 and 1937 Keith had exhibitions in America, supported by California-based collector of Asian art Grace Nicholson, as well as an exhibition at the Beaux Arts Gallery in London which was visited by Queen Elizabeth the Queen Mother. During World War II, Keith raised money to assist Chinese women affected by Japan's military violence, though she apparently "retained warm feelings for her many Japanese friends." In 1946 she and her sister Elspet published a book titled Old Korea: The Land of the Morning Calm, which included criticism of Japan's colonisation of Korea before and during the war and was dedicated to General Douglas MacArthur, Lord Louis Mountbatten, and Admiral Chester Nimitz.

== Personal life and legacy ==
Keith died in London in 1956 after a prolonged illness.

Keith prints are both rare and expensive, as the number of printed copies was small and in her lifetime she could not sell larger editions. Some of her prints were published in only 30 or 50 copies. During her lifetime some of her works were acquired by the British Museum, the Musée Guimet in Paris, the National Gallery of Canada, and the Honolulu Academy of Arts. Queen Elizabeth The Queen Mother bought several of Keith's prints in 1937. Her portfolio consists of more than a hundred woodblock prints and about a dozen color etchings. All of her woodblock prints are signed in pencil. The signatures are however today often very faded. Significant holdings of Keith's work can be found at the Jordan Schnitzer Museum of Art at the University of Oregon.
