= Homme (surname) =

Homme is a surname. Notable people with the surname include:

- Bob Homme (1919–2000), American-Canadian television actor
- Josh Homme (born 1973), American rock musician
- Robert O. Homme (born c. 1941), American diplomat

== See also ==
- Nienke Hommes (born 1977), Dutch rower
