= Kanō Tomonobu =

Japanese painter

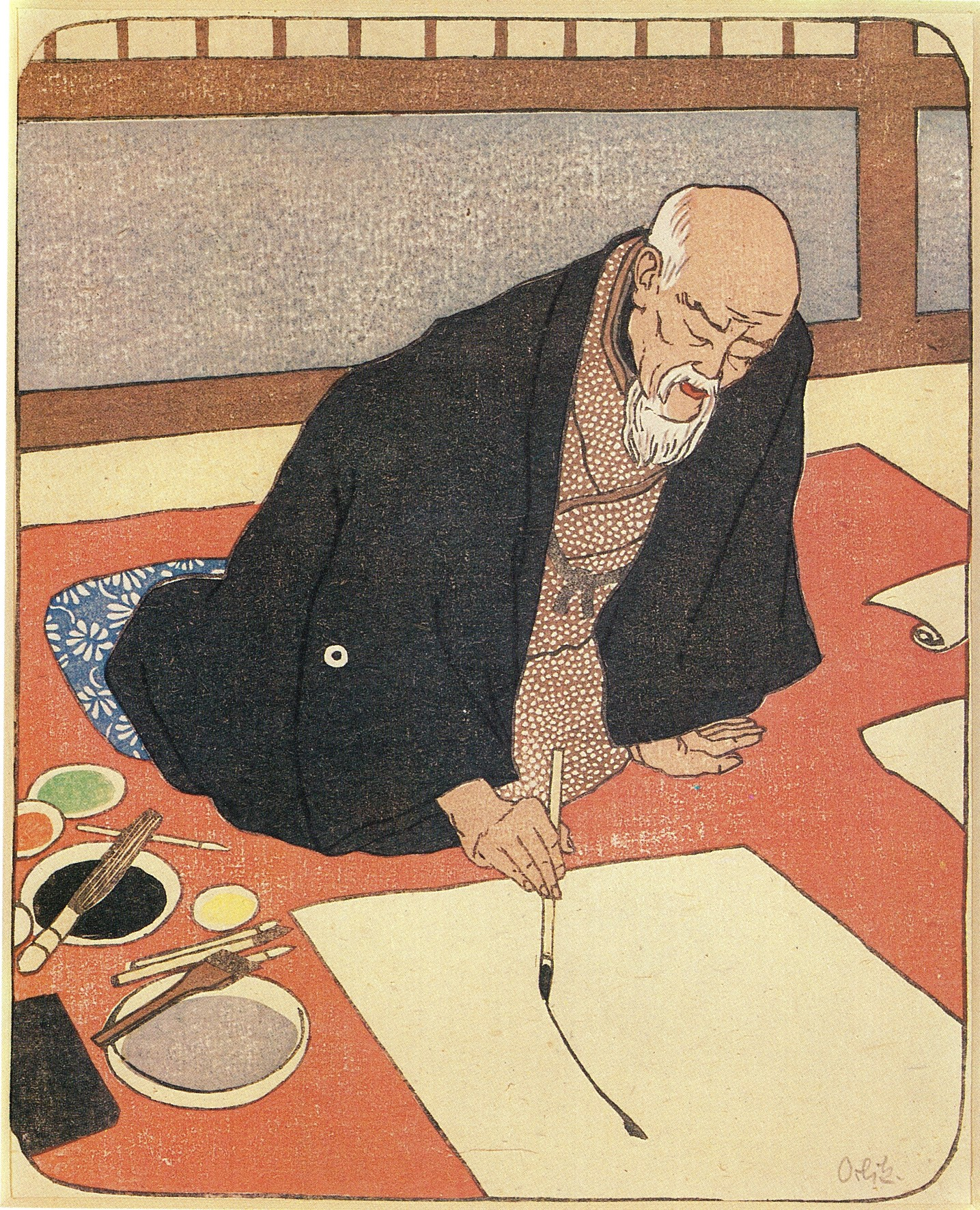

Kanō Tomonobu (狩野 友信, 24 April 1843 – 15 July 1912) was a Japanese painter of the Kanō school. He used the art names Shunsen (春川) and Isseisai (一青斎).

== Life and career ==
Tomonobu apprenticed under the official painter for the shōgun (the oku-eshi) in 1859, at age 16.

On the suggestion of his brother-in-law Kawada Hiromu, the governor of Sagami Province, who had travelled to France as part of a shogunal delegation, Tomonobu studied Western painting at the Foreign Studies Centre for two years beginning in 1863. He then spent three years beginning in 1865 at the school of Kawakami Tōgai, and while there studied with the English artist Charles Wirgman for two years. He helped the American art historian Ernest Fenollosa in his studies of Japanese art and introduced Fenollosa to the painter Kanō Hōgai.

Tomonobu worked at the Ministry of Popular Affairs in 1870. He taught at the University of Tokyo in 1877, the Tokyo University Preparatory School in 1880, the Tokyo School of Fine Arts in 1889.
