= Hashira-e =

Japanese woodblock prints

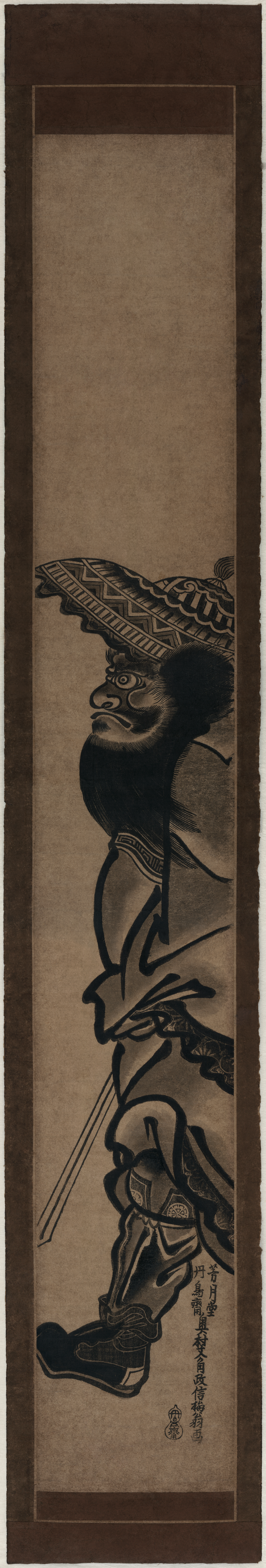
Shōki zu (Shōki striding), by originator of this format, Okumura Masanobu ( c. 1741–1751)

Hashira-e (柱絵) or pillar prints are Japanese woodblock prints usually measuring about 13cm x 73cm (4.5 in. by 28 in.).

They were originally intended to be hung upon, or pasted onto, wooden pillars inside Japanese houses. They probably served as cheap alternatives to hanging scrolls (kakemono) which were typically made of silk. Okumura Masanobu (1686–1764) is credited with popularizing this format of print. They were popular during the second half of the eighteenth century. Surviving examples are rare, and often faded, worn, or stained from exposure to soot and smoke.

Ukiyo-e artist Koryūsai (1735–1790) designed many hashira-e depicting a wide variety of subjects, particularly gods and beautiful women (bijin-ga). His hashira-e are considered among the finest designs ever created in the format: Koryūsai devised a subtle yet effective way of offsetting the insistent verticality of the tall, narrow pillar shape by emphasizing the curves of the lower robe of his female figures, echoing them in the furisode sleeves and accentuating the resulting diagonals with a lattice pattern on the outer garment. The popularity of hashira format prints began to wane around 1800 and they were superseded by vertical diptychs of the larger Oban tate-e format – tate, meaning 'portrait', e meaning 'picture') the most frequent size for Japanese woodblock prints at approx. 24.4cm x 38cm (10 by 15 inches). Oban tate-e (and its landscape orientation Oban yoko-e) offered greater compositional freedom for artists of the nineteenth and the first half of the twentieth century.

== Gallery ==
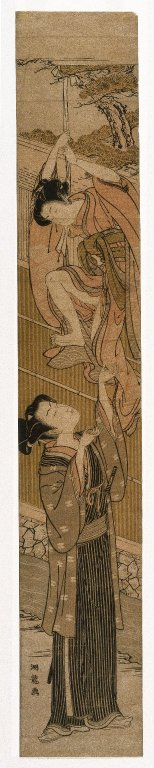
Lovers' Tryst, Koryūsai

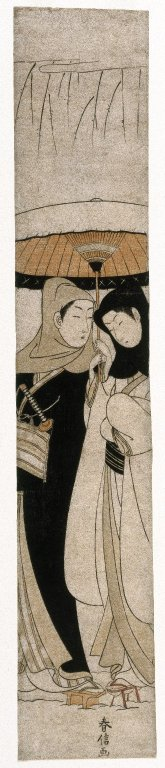
Two Lovers in Snow beneath Umbrella, Suzuki Harunobu

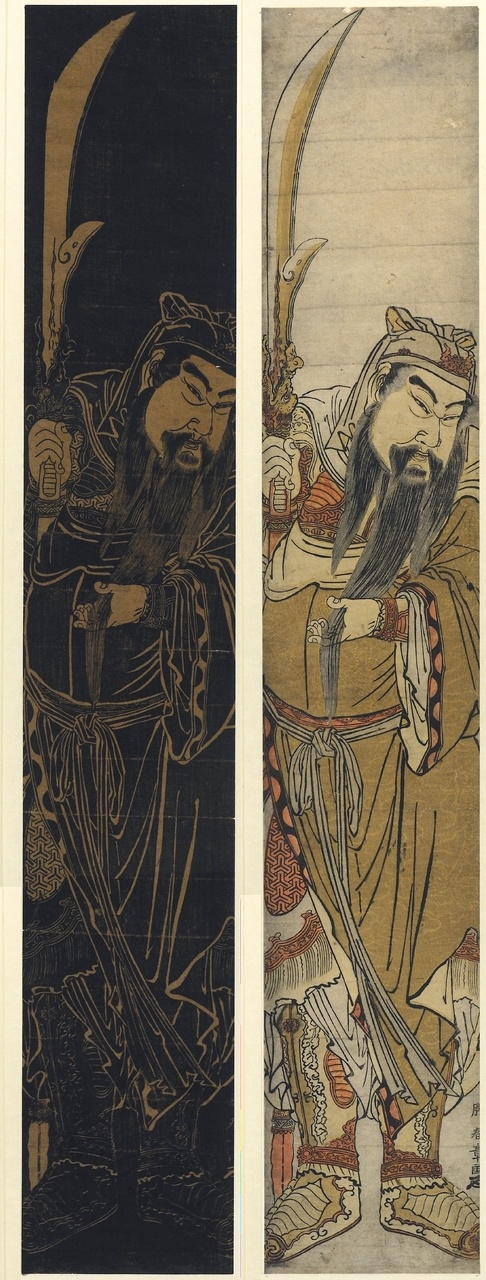
General Yu (left: ishizuri-e; right: normal version), Katsukawa Shunshō

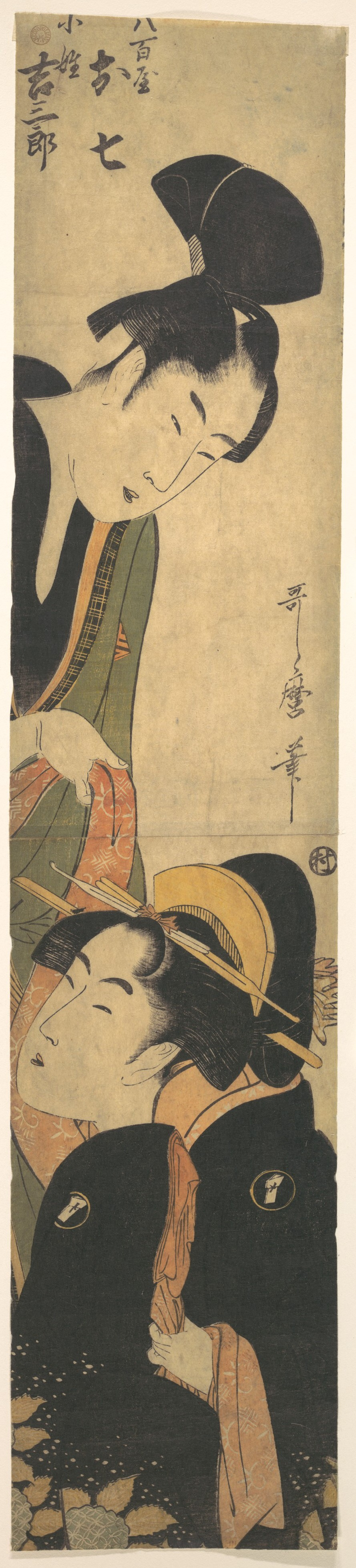
Oshichi and Kichisaburo, Kitigawa Utamaro
