= Koryūsai =

Japanese printmaker and painter (1735–1790)

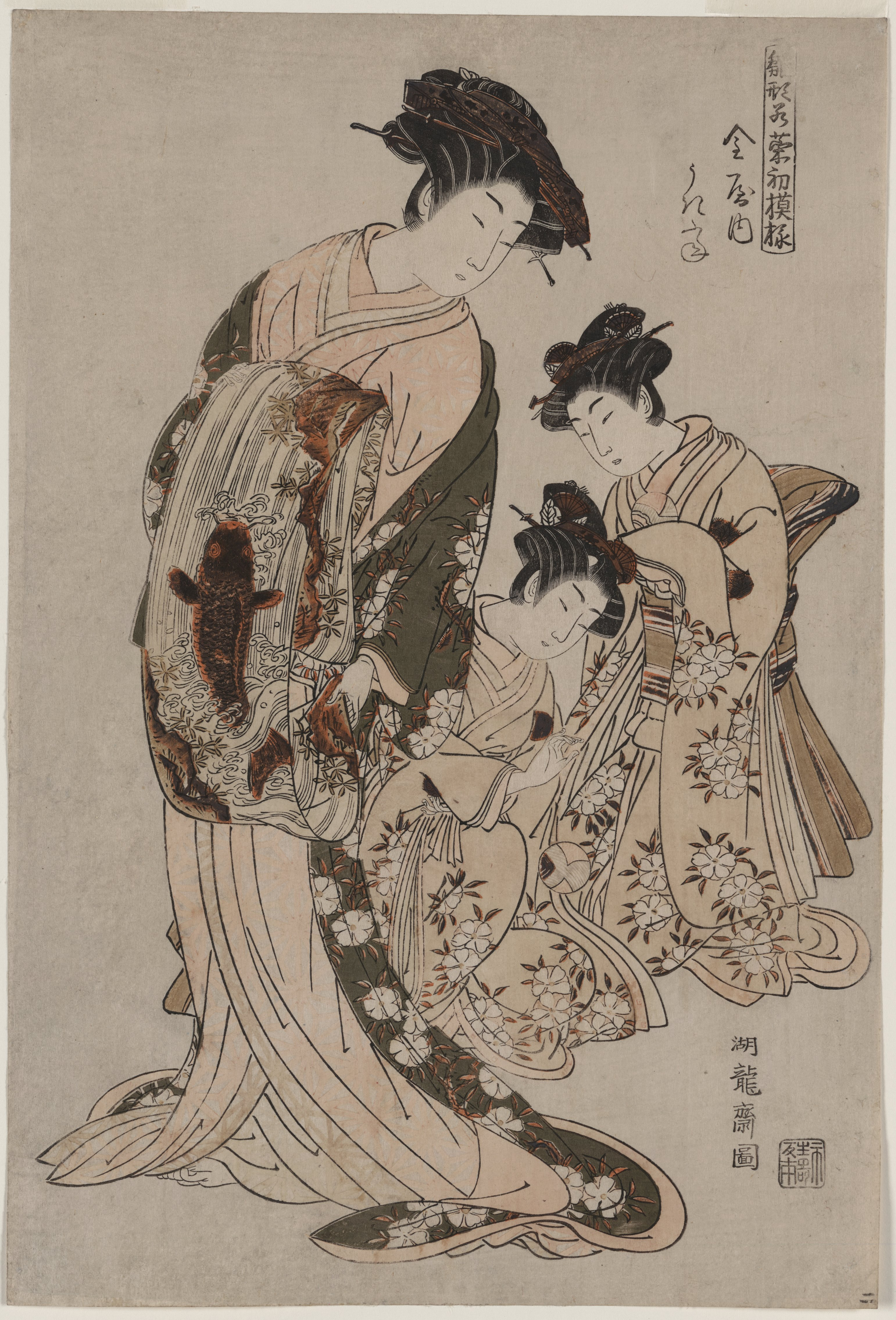
Hinagata wakana no hatsu moyō

Isoda Koryūsai (礒田 湖龍斎, 1735–1790) was a Japanese ukiyo-e print designer and painter active from 1769 to 1790.

== Life and career ==
Koryūsai was born in 1735 and worked as a samurai in the service of the Tsuchiya clan. He was born Isoda Masakatsu. He became a masterless rōnin after the death of the head of the clan and moved to Edo (modern Tokyo) where he settled near Ryōgoku Bridge in the Yagenbori area. He became a print designer there under the art name Haruhiro in 1769, at first making samurai-themed designs. The ukiyo-e print master Harunobu died in 1770, and about that time Koryūsai began making prints in a similar style of life in the pleasure districts.

Koryūsai was a prolific designer of individual prints and print series, most of which appeared between 1769 and 1881.

In 1782, Koryūsai applied for and received the Buddhist honour hokkyō ("Bridge of the Law") from the imperial court and thereafter used the title as part of his signature. His output slowed from this time, though he continued to design prints until his death in 1790.

== Works ==
Koryūsai created a total of 2,500 known designs, or an average of four a week. According to art historian Allen Hockley, "Koryūsai may ... have been the most productive artist of the eighteenth century".

The series Models for Fashion: New Designs as Fresh Young Leaves (Hinagata wakana no hatsumoyō, 1776–1781) ran for 140 prints, the longest known ukiyo-e print series of beauties. He designed at least 350 hashira-e pillar prints, numerous kachō-e bird-and-flower prints, a great number of shunga erotic prints, and others. Ninety of his nikuhitsu-ga paintings are known, making him one of the most productive painters of the period.

Koryūsai's hashira-e pillar prints are considered among the finest ever produced in that format: to offset the insistent verticality of the tall, narrow hashira shape, he devised compositions that emphasised the curves of women's lower garments, echoing them with the furisode sleeve and reinforcing the resulting diagonals with a lattice pattern on the outer robe. His series Hinagata wakana no hatsumoyō, published in ōban format by Nishimura Yohachi (Eijudō), included eleven designs contributed by Torii Kiyonaga.

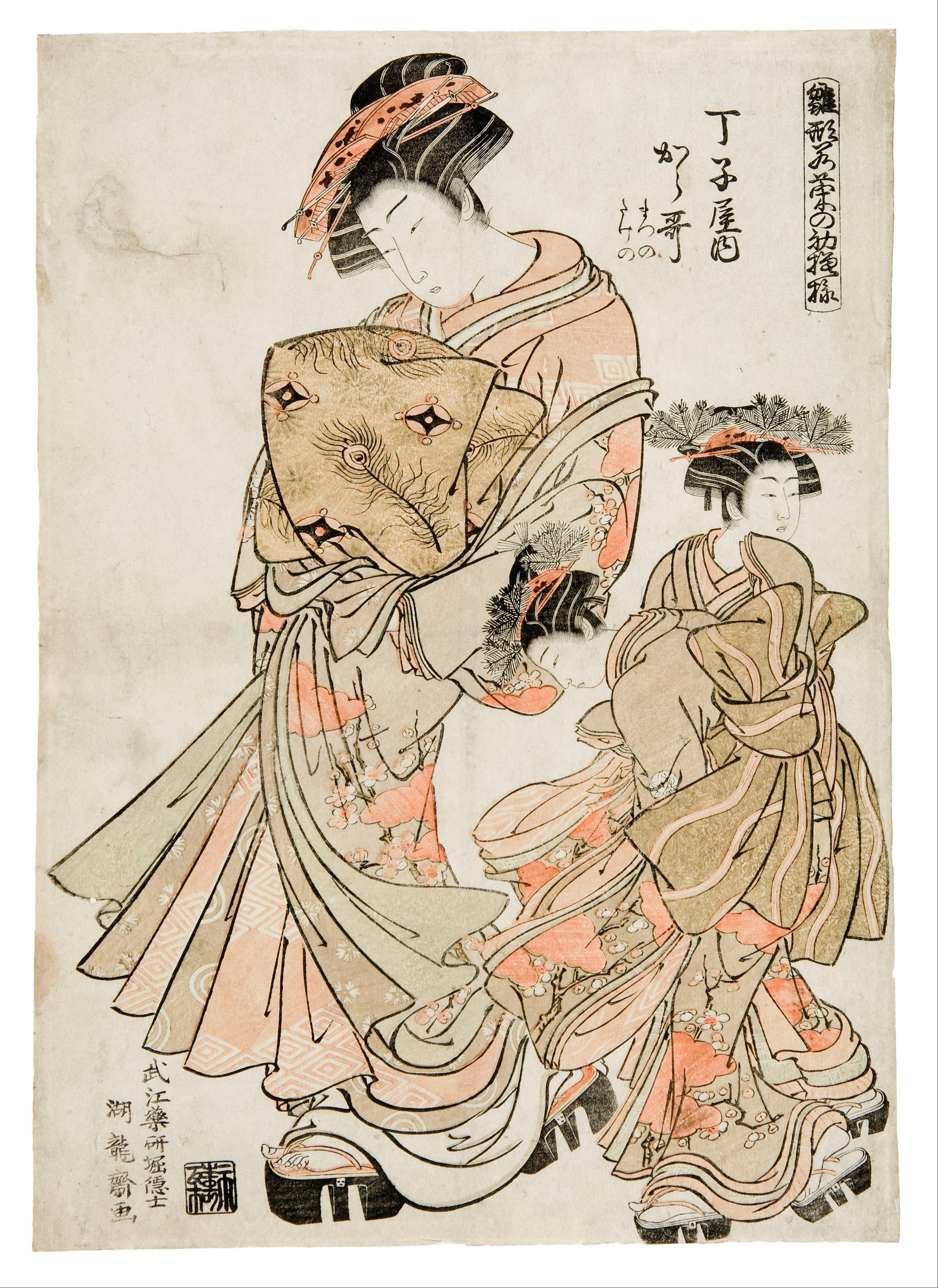
Isoda Koryusai: New designs as fresh as young leaves (1778)

== Legacy ==
Despite Koryūsai's productivity and popularity—both in his time and amongst later collectors—his work has attracted little scholarship. The first ukiyo-e histories written in the West in the 19th century elevated certain artists as exemplars; Koryūsai's work came to be seen as too indebted to Harunobu, who died in 1770, and inferior to that of Kiyonaga, whose peak period came in the 1880s. An example is Woldemar von Seidlitz's Geschichte des japanischen Farbenholzschnittes ("History of Japanese colour prints", 1897), the most popular of the early ukiyo-e histories, which paints Koryūsai as a successor to Harunobu and a rival of Kiyonaga in the 1770s who slipped into mediocrity and imitation of his rival by the end of the decade. Interest lay mainly in the details of Koryūsai's life—a samurai who received court honours was unusual in the proletarian world of ukiyo-e. In 2021, contemporary woodblock printmaker David Bull created a series of 12 prints depicting nature scenes adapted from Koryūsai's designs.

His work is held in the permanent collections of several museums worldwide, including the British Museum, the Museum of Fine Arts, Boston, the Carnegie Museum of Art, the Princeton University Art Museum, the Minneapolis Institute of Art, the University of Michigan Museum of Art, the Hermitage Museum, the Suntory Museum of Art, the Israel Museum, the Krannert Art Museum, the Los Angeles County Museum of Art, the Philadelphia Museum of Art, the Honolulu Museum of Art, the Museum of New Zealand, the Brooklyn Museum, the Ashmolean Museum, the Fine Arts Museum of San Francisco, the Freer Gallery of Art, the Indianapolis Museum of Art, the Chazen Museum of Art, the Portland Art Museum, and the Kimbell Art Museum.
