= Tsukioka =

Tsukioka may refer to:

People:

- Tsukioka Settei (1710–1787), Japanese ukiyo-e artist
- Kōgyo Tsukioka (1869–1927), Japanese artist of the Meiji period
- Yoshitoshi Tsukioka (1839–1892), Japanese artist
- Yumeji Tsukioka (1922–2017), Japanese film actress

Railway stations:

- Tsukioka Station (Niigata), railway station in the city of Shibata, Niigata, Japan
- Tsukioka Station (Toyama), railway station on the Toyama Chihō Railway Kamidaki Line in the city of Toyama, Japan

== See also ==
- Tsuki
- Tsuko (disambiguation)
