= Tachibana Minko =

Japanese artist of illustrated books

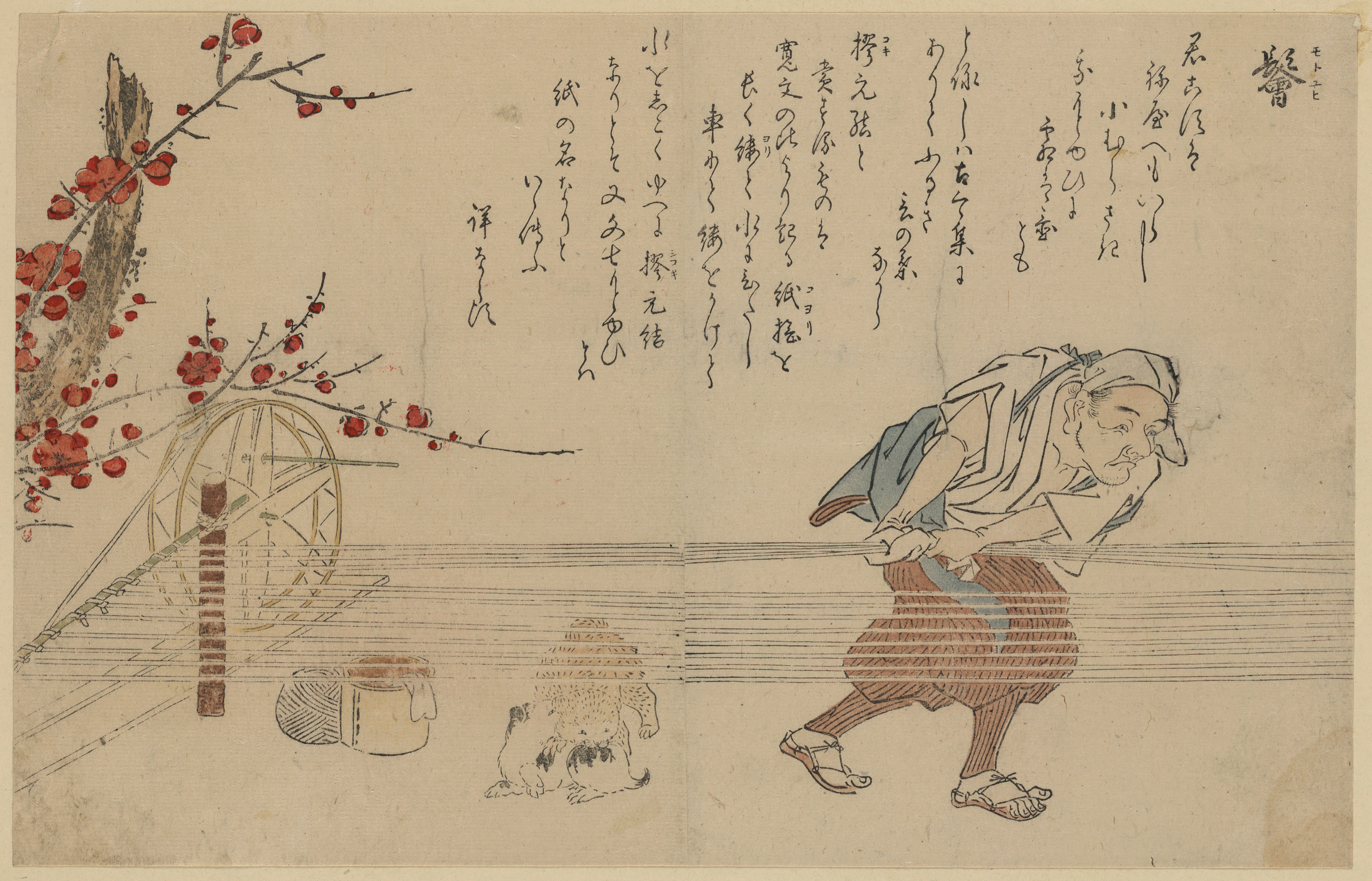
Cordmaker from the Shokunin Burui, 1770

Tachibana Minkō (fl. 1750s–1770s) was a Japanese artist of the Edo period. His art name was Gyokujuken. Originally an embroiderer working in metal foils in Osaka, he later became a woodblock printer and moved to Edo. He is particularly famous for his illustrated book Saiga Shokunin Burui (彩画職人部類 Various Classes of Artisans in Coloured Pictures) which further developed techniques of stencil printing (kappazuri).

An artist of great skill, he followed the style of Sukenobu (1671–1750) when in Osaka. After his moved to Edo he was influenced by Harunobu (1725–1770) and adopted his beautiful women (bijin-ga) style.

== Saiga Shokunin Burui ==
Minkō is best known for his illustrated book of craftsmen Saiga Shokunin Burui which was released in two volumes in 1770 and 1771. It has been described as "Probably the finest kappazuri work ever produced in Japan and a deeply interesting account of contemporary craftsmanship." Although artisan pictures were not particularly popular compared to works depicting kabuki actors or courtesans, the quality of his work helped the book become an immediate success.

The book is a useful historical document, especially for those crafts which no longer exist. Over the two volumes twenty-eight crafts are shown: hatter, mirror polisher, carpenter, swordsmith, armorer, cordmaker, maker of hairdress ties, weaver, papermaker, engraver, maker of bamboo blinds, fletcher, basketmaker, ballmaker, glassblower, fanmaker, koto (Japanese harp) maker, kabuki maskmaker, brushmaker, potter, maker of straw mats (tatami), woodworker, paper mounter on sliding doors, playing-card maker, maker of paper umbrellas, maker of millstones, needlemaker, and maker of inkstones.

Pomeroy's Traditional Crafts of Japan (1968) is illustrated with works from the series. He remarks that Minkō's style was "fresh, and his approach to the theme was new. His artisans are infused with a sense of dignity and pride in their work, and quite often they have personalities of their own. Minimizing the background, Minko gives a close-up view of his craftsmen and their tools in carefully composed scenes. Precise in detail as far as the woodblock medium permitted, yet soft in feeling, the prints reflect a strong interest in his subjects and a sincere feeling of humanity toward them. Although his women are depicted in the ideal-ized manner of the ukiyo-e artists, his men are portrayed more earthily, for the most part, except for the poetic license that Minko sometimes takes with their costumes. His use of color in these illustrations is ex-cellent. Superbly shaded, they are nevertheless bright enough to have great beauty without being so gaudy as to draw attention to themselves. The technique of shading, known as surikomi saishoku, is sometimes said to have been Minko's own invention, and he is supposed to have devised it while attempting to copy the colors in a Chinese picture book."

The two volumes were reprinted in 1784 with an introduction by Ota Shokusan, a famous writer of the time. Another reprint was made in 1916, although this was printed with polychrome woodblocks, not stenciled.

== Other works ==
His 1765 series Kitsune no yomeiri ("The Fox Wedding") was produced in collaboration with five other artists, probably his pupils. A set sold for US$107,550 in 2004.
