= Ishikawa Toyonobu =

Japanese print artist, 1711–1785

- 石川 豊信
- Born: 1711
- Died: July 1, 1785 (aged 73–74)
- Style: Ukiyo-e
- Movement: Kaigetsudō school

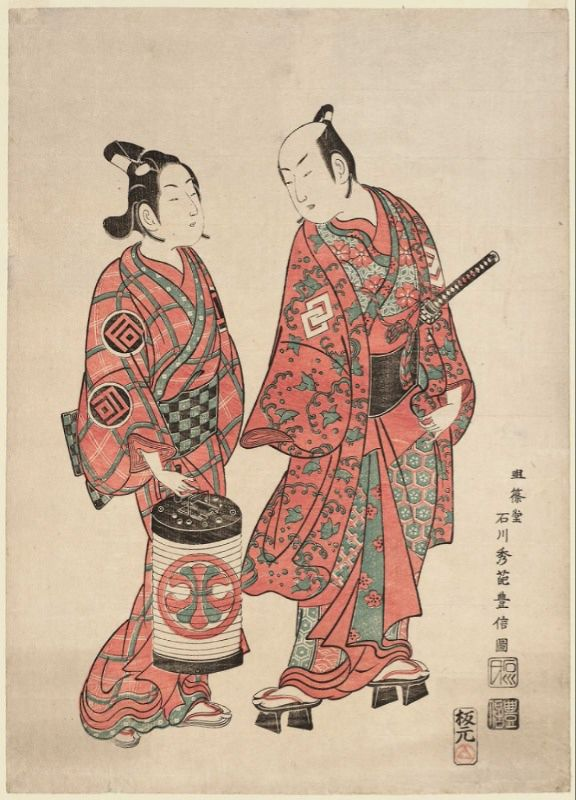
Kabuki actors Nakamura Shichisaburō and Sanogawa Ichimatsu, in 1740s print by Toyonobu.

Ishikawa Toyonobu (石川 豊信; 1711 – July 1, 1785) was a Japanese ukiyo-e print artist. He is sometimes said to have been the same person as Nishimura Shigenobu, a contemporary ukiyo-e artist and student of Nishimura Shigenaga about whom very little is known. His earliest works are indeed signed "Nishimura Magosaburō Shigenobu"; he only later adopted the gō Tanshōdō, Meijōdō and Shūha.

A pupil of Nishimura Shigenaga, Toyonobu produced many monochrome "lacquer prints" (urushi-e) which reflected the influence of Okumura Masanobu as well. During the 1730s and 1740s he produced numerous yakusha-e and bijinga in this style, and went on to found the Ishikawa Toyonobu school in Kyoto. Many of these were yakusha-e (actor prints) and bijin-ga (images of beautiful women), including images of standing courtesans, whose faces conveyed an impassivity typical of the works of the Kaigetsudō school.

Toyonobu also experimented with semi-nude forms, something his chief predecessors also did, but never succeeded in developing it into a trend or subgenre within ukiyo-e. Art historian Richard Lane points out that these images, depicting women with the top half of their kimono open and let down to reveal their chests, were intended as suggestive and erotic, and were not "glorification of the human form such as we find in Greek art".

Later in his career, Toyonobu became one of the leading producers of color prints, chiefly benizuri-e ("rose prints"), but stopped producing ukiyo-e shortly after Suzuki Harunobu pioneered the full-color print (nishiki-e) in 1765.

He had one notable pupil, Ishikawa Toyomasa, who is known chiefly for his depictions of children at play, and who may have been Toyonobu's son.

== Works ==
=== Bijin-ga Prints ===
Bijin-ga prints depict beautiful and erotic images of women, intended for urban citizens during the Edo period. Some Bijin-ga prints of Ishikawa Toyonubu include imagery or references of sex workers.

"Beauty Reading A Letter" c. 1758 depicts a woman reading a letter on a scroll and the interior of a room. It is a benizuri-e color woodblock print which was on display at the Art Institute of Chicago

"Courtesan Reading a Letter" c. 1745 was on display at the Art Institute of Chicago. It is a hand-colored woodblock print of a prostitute reading a letter, adorned in floral and patterned wear.

Prostitute of Osaka, Left Sheet c. 1745. A young female attendant carrying a cup of sake represents the city of Osaka.

=== Urushi-e Prints ===
Ishikawa Toyonobu made lacquer paintings, also referred to as Urushi-e. Of Sanogawa checkered Hisamatsu c. 1745 was a woodblock print with hand coloring and lacquer. The print portrays "a Kabuki actor, Sanogawa Ichimatsu is shown concealing a letter addressed 'Somoji' (To You). He is identified by the crest on his sleeve". The print is currently displayed at the Honolulu Museum of Art.

=== Yakusha-e Prints ===
Some of his prints include subject based benizuri-e prints, often showcasing actors and figures in theatre. During the Edo period, the theater form of Kabuki thrived and emerged, making actors a common subject of painters.

The Actor Sanogawa Ichimatsu I as Hisamatsu c. 1748

The Actors Onoe Kikugoro I and Sanogawa Ichimatsu I dressed as mendicant monks c. 1744

A hosoban benizuri-e print of two actors portraying a young man removing snow from a woman's geta c. 1750

== Collections ==
His work is held in many museums worldwide, including the British Museum, the Museum of Fine Arts, Boston, the Metropolitan Museum of Art, the Israel Museum, Jerusalem, the Harvard Art Museums, the Asian Art Museum, the University of Michigan Museum of Art, the Minneapolis Institute of Art, the Victoria and Albert Museum, the MOA Museum of Art, the Ota Memorial Museum of Art, the National Museum of Asian Art, the Museo Nacional del Prado, the Art Institute of Chicago, the Portland Art Museum, the RISD Museum, and the Fine Arts Museums of San Francisco.

== Gallery ==
Works by Ishikawa Toyonobu

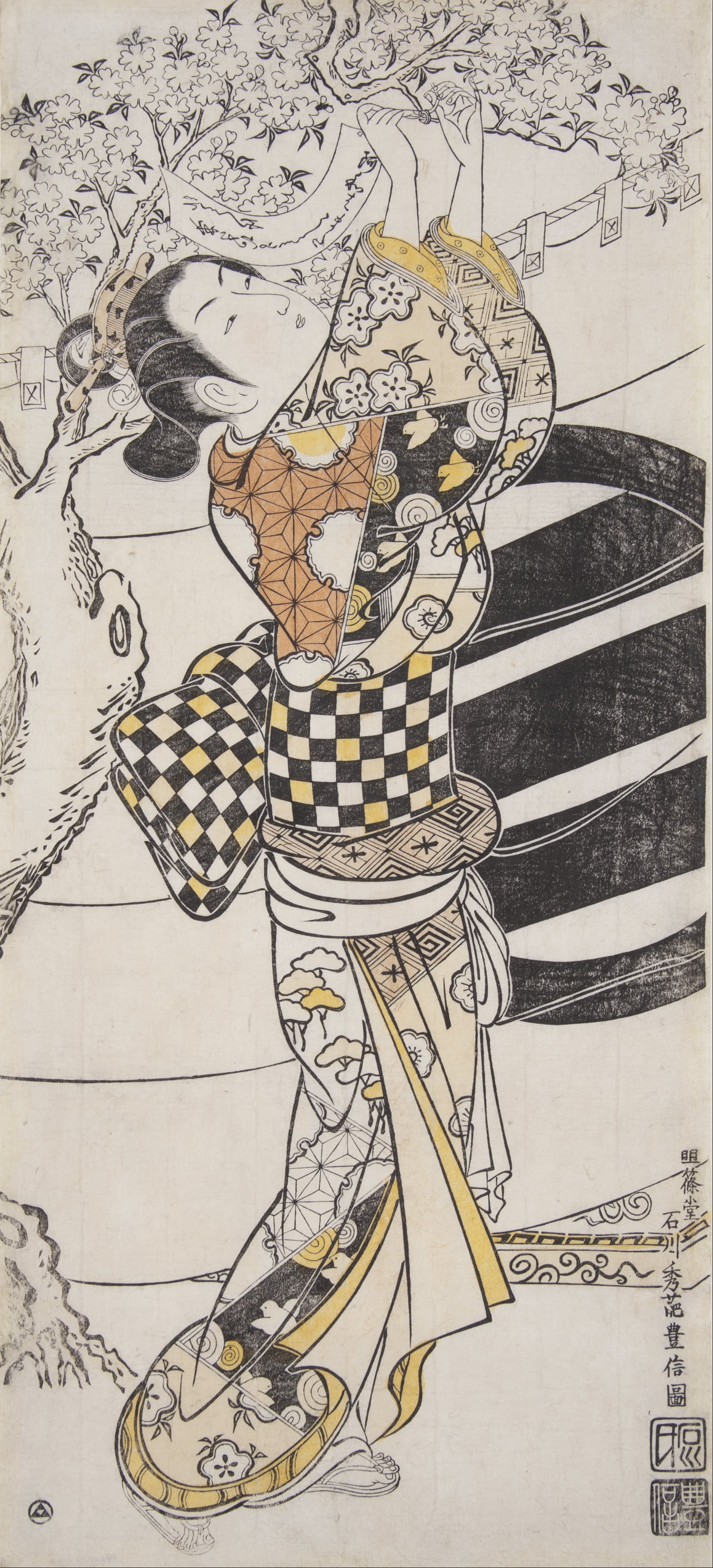
Hanging a Poem on a Cherry Tree (Urushi-e)

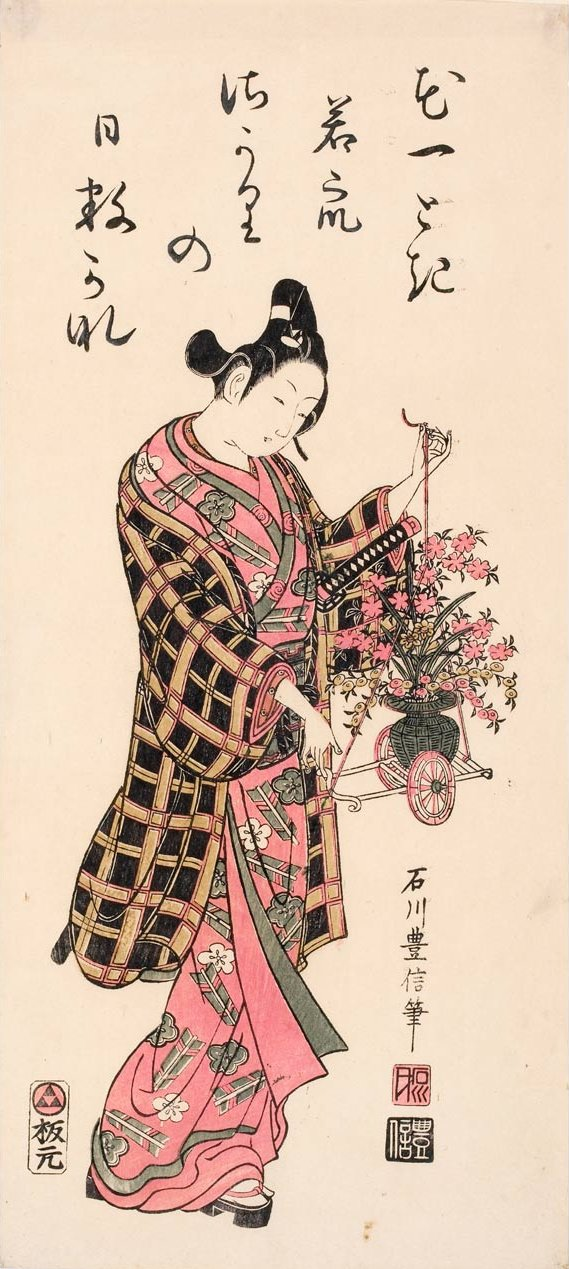
Wakashu with a Flower Cart

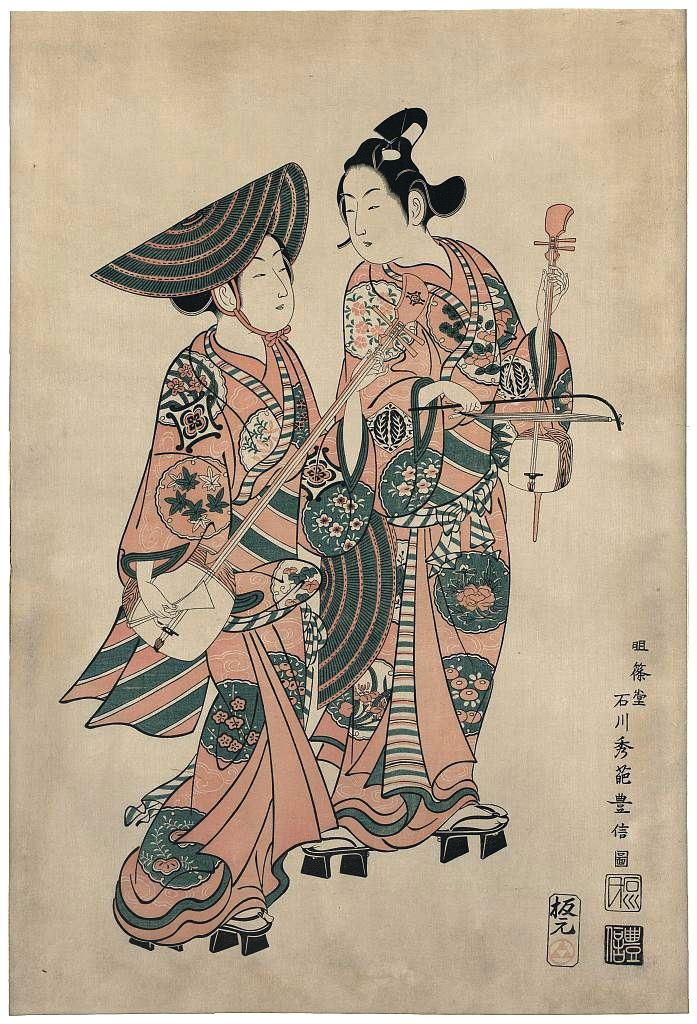
Torioi by Japanese Kabuki actors

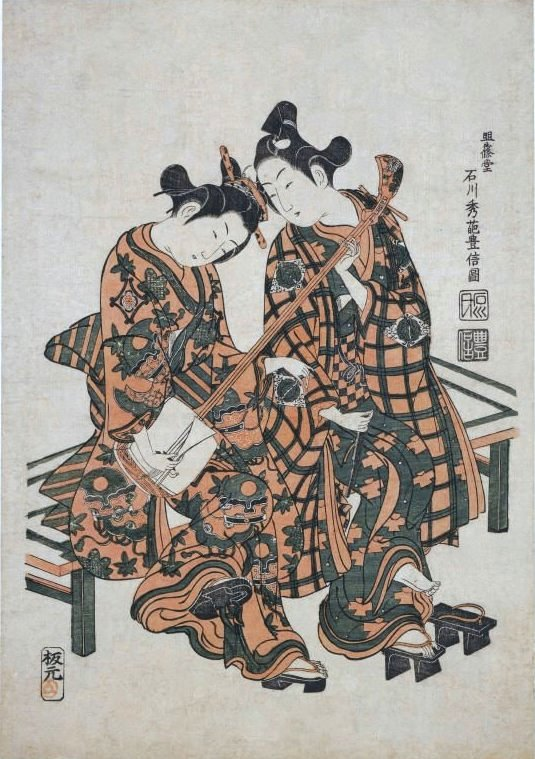
Kabuki actors Onoe Kikugoro I and Nakamura Kiyosaburo
