= Mitsusuke =

- Gender: Male

Origin
- Origin: Japanese
- Meaning: Different meanings depending on the kanji used

Mitsusuke (written: 満祐 or 光祐) is a masculine Japanese given name. Notable people with the name include:

- Akamatsu Mitsusuke (赤松 満祐) (1381–1441), Japanese daimyō
- Mitsusuke Harada (原田 満祐) (born 1928), Japanese karateka
- Tosa Mitsusuke (土佐 光祐) (1675–1710), Japanese artist
