= Benizuri-e =

Japanese woodblock prints

Benizuri-e (紅刷絵; "crimson printed pictures") are a type of "primitive" ukiyo-e style Japanese woodblock prints. They were usually printed in pink (beni) and green, occasionally with the addition of another color, either printed or added by hand. The technique developed in the early 18th century out of an earlier hand-coloring method that relied mainly on a red-orange pigment called tan, sometimes combined with yellow and blue; tan was gradually replaced by beni, a pink-red dye extracted from the safflower plant (Carthamus tinctorius), which became the technique's dominant colour and gave benizuri-e their name. Throughout the roughly twenty years of their popularity, from the 1740s to the 1760s, the number of woodblocks used per print gradually increased but remained below five. The technique was refined chiefly through private commissions such as surimono and calendars, before being adapted for the wider commercial market that nishiki-e would later dominate.

The production of benizuri-e reached its peak in the early 1740s. Torii Kiyohiro, Torii Kiyomitsu I, Torii Kiyonobu I, Okumura Masanobu, Nishimura Shigenaga, and Ishikawa Toyonobu are the artists most closely associated with benizuri-e.

== Gallery of benizuri-e ==
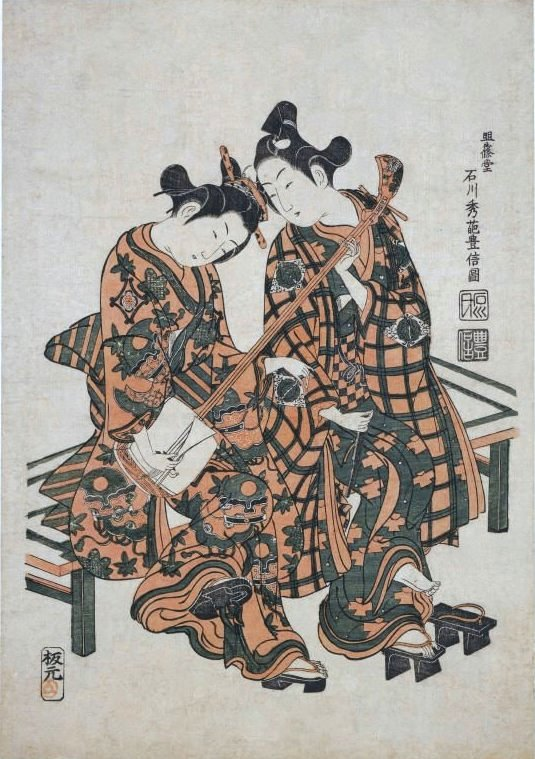
Woodblock print by Ishikawa Toyonobu of kabuki actors Onoe Kikugorō I and Nakamura Kiyosaburō as a young seated couple playing a shamisen signed 'Meijōdō Ishikawa Shūha Toyonobu zu', 1750–1758

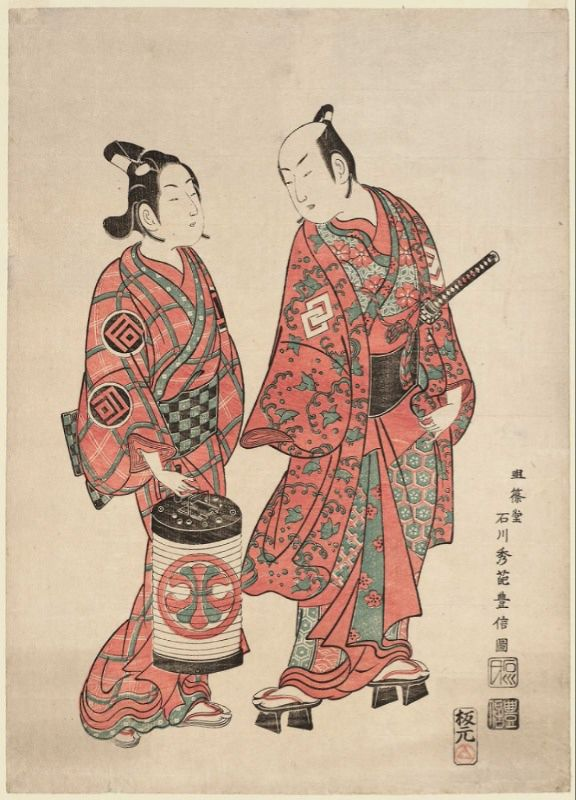
Woodblock print by Ishikawa Toyonobu of kabuki actors Nakamura Shichisaburō II and Sanogawa Ichimatsu, signed 'Meijōdō Ishikawa Shūha Toyonobu zu', 1740s

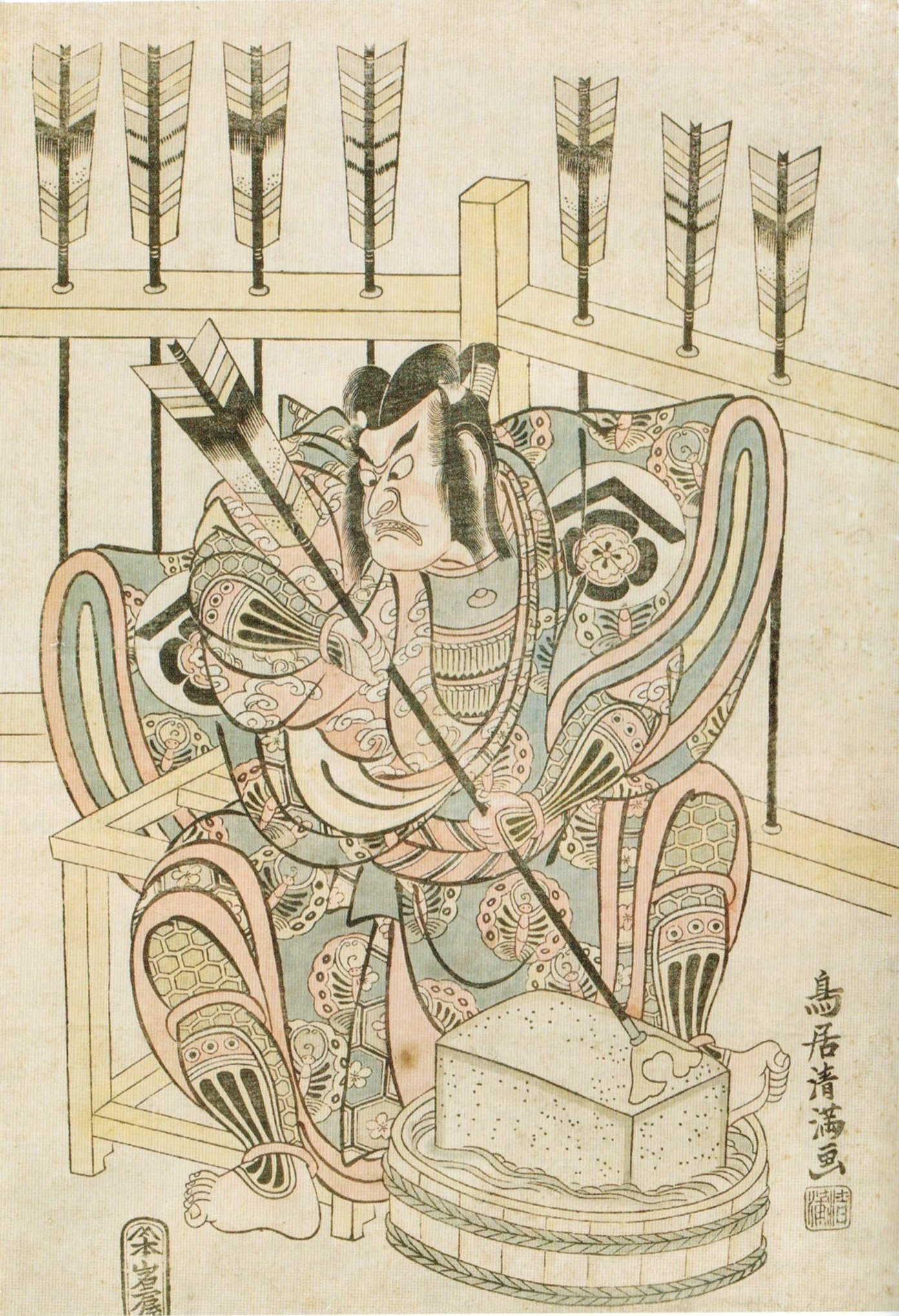
Actor Ichikawa Ebizō II as Yanone Gorō in the kabuki play Koizome Sumidagawa, woodblock print by Torii Kiyomitsu I, Honolulu Museum of Art

18th century Benizuri-e of Sei Shōnagon, author of The Pillow Book, attributed to Tsukioka Settei
