= Suzuki Harunobu =

Japanese ukiyo-e artist (c. 1725 – 1770)

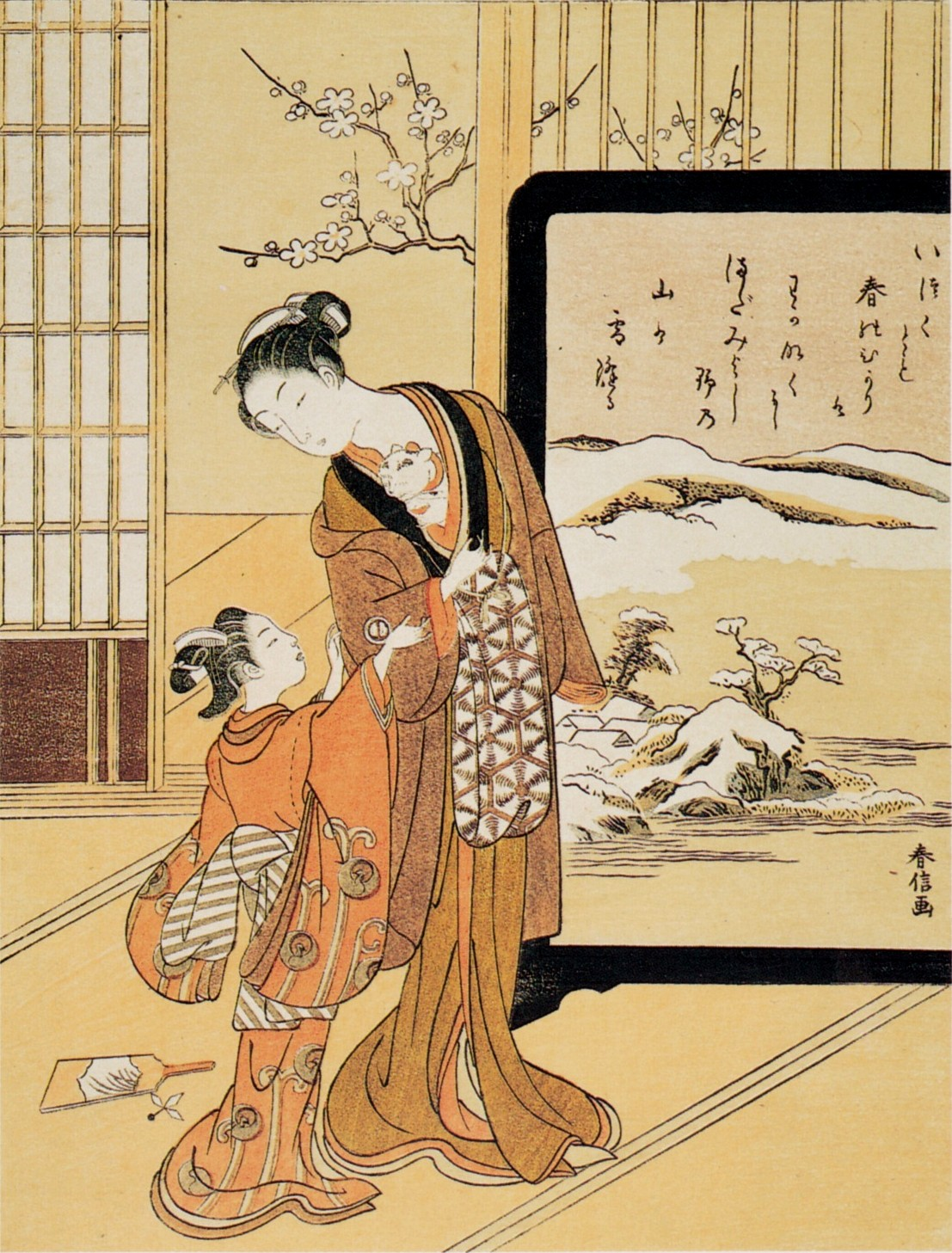
Two girls, c. 1750

Suzuki Harunobu (Japanese: 鈴木 春信; c. 1725 – 8 July 1770) was a Japanese designer of woodblock print art in the ukiyo-e style. He was an innovator, the first to produce full-color prints (nishiki-e) in 1765, rendering obsolete the former modes of two- and three-color prints. Harunobu used many special techniques, and depicted a wide variety of subjects, from classical poems to contemporary beauties. Like many artists of his day, Harunobu also produced a number of shunga, or erotic images. During his lifetime and shortly afterwards, many artists imitated his style. A few, such as Harushige, even boasted of their ability to forge the work of the great master. Much about Harunobu's life is unknown.

== Influences ==
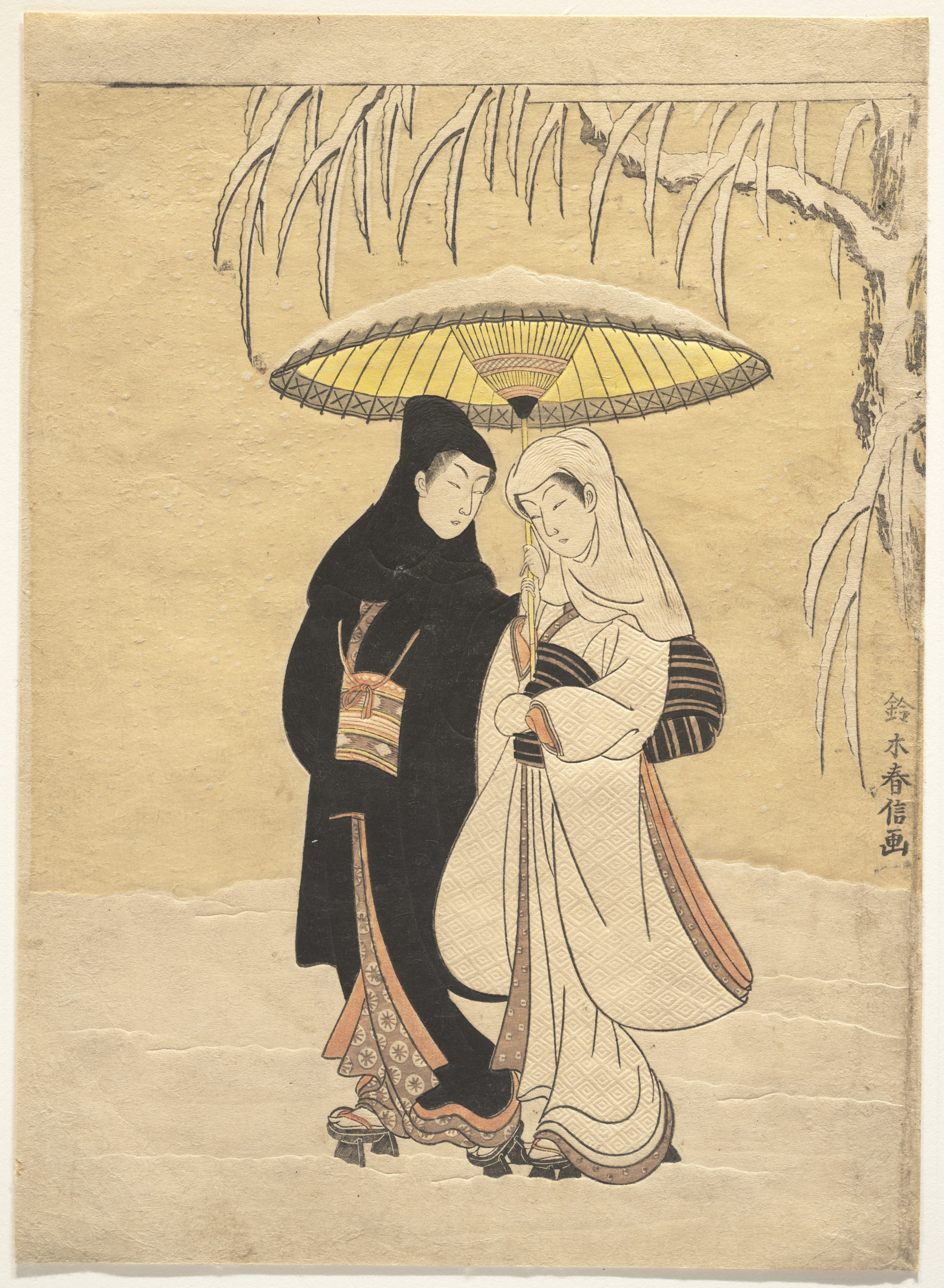
Lovers Beneath an Umbrella in the Snow

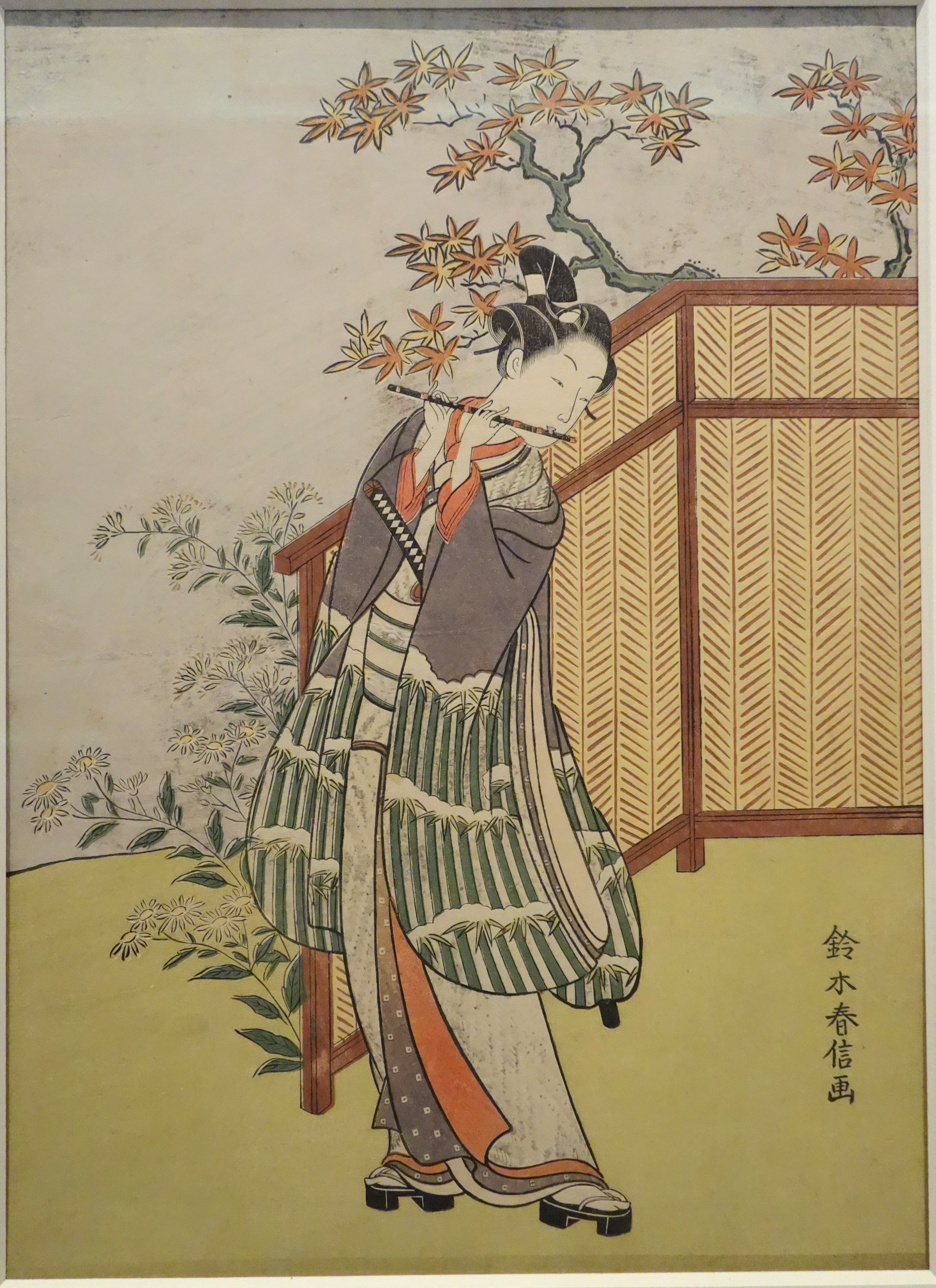
Young Man Playing Flute

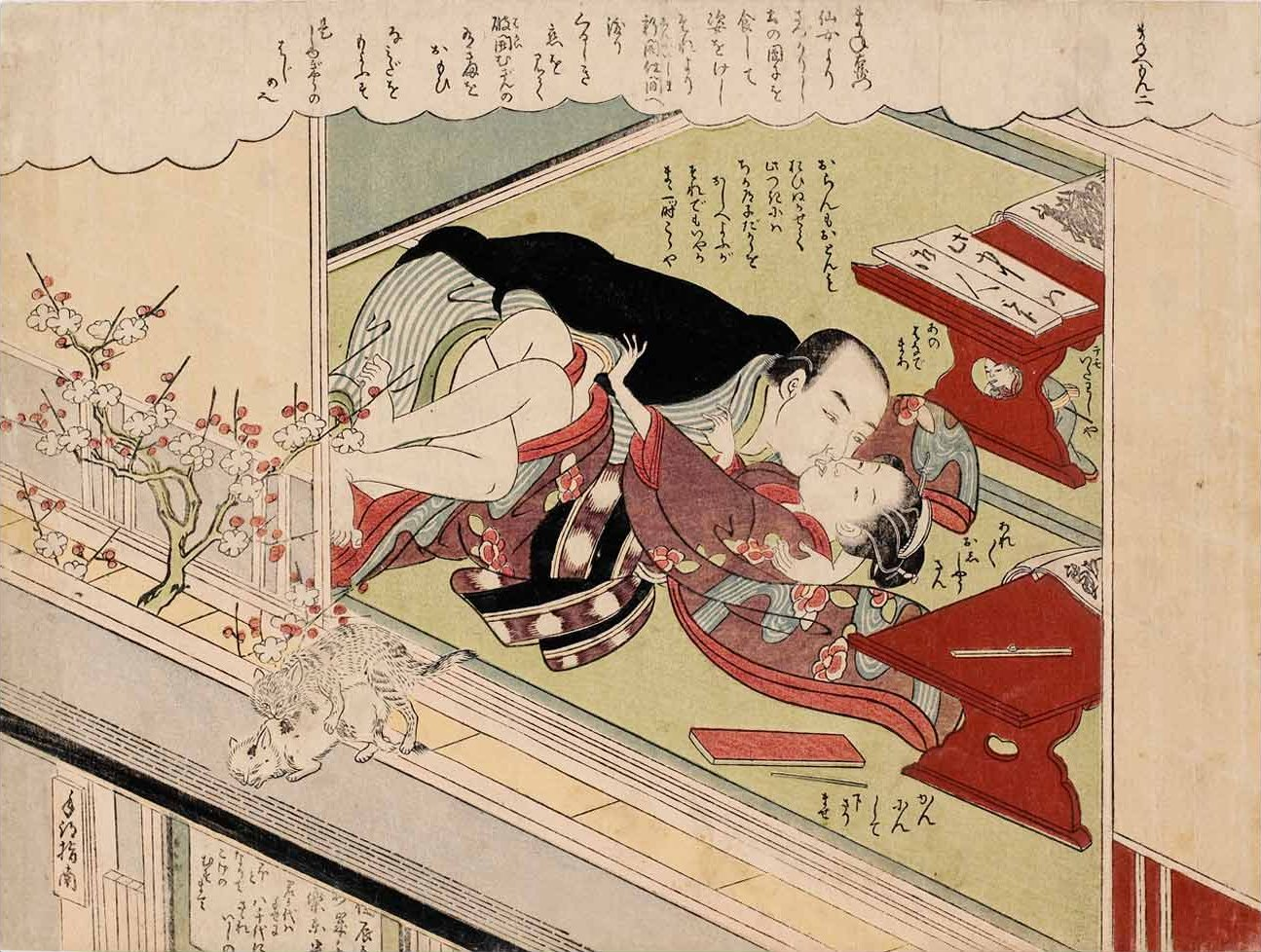
Sexual misconduct, from the book Fashionable, Lusty Mane'emon, 1770, Honolulu Museum of Art

Though some scholars assert that Harunobu was originally from Kyoto, pointing to possible influences from Nishikawa Sukenobu, much of his work, in particular his early work, is in the Edo style. His work shows evidence of influences from many artists, including Torii Kiyomitsu, Ishikawa Toyonobu, the Kawamata school, and the Kanō school. However, the strongest influence upon Harunobu was the painter and printmaker Nishikawa Sukenobu, who may have been Harunobu's direct teacher.

== Artistic career ==
Little is known of Harunobu's early life; his birthplace and birthdate are unknown, but it is believed he grew up in Kyoto. It is said he was 46 at his death in 1770. Unlike most ukiyo-e artists, Harunobu used his real name rather than an artist name. He was from a samurai family, and had an ancestor who was a retainer of Tokugawa Ieyasu in Mikawa Province; this Suzuki accompanied Ieyasu to Edo when the latter had his capital built there. Harunobu's grandfather Shigemitsu and father Shigekazu were stripped of their hatamoto status when they were found to be involved in financing of gambling and other activities; they were exiled from Edo and relocated to Kyoto. At some point, Harunobu became a student of the ukiyo-e master Nishikawa Sukenobu.

Harunobu began his career in the style of the Torii school, creating many works which, while skillful, were not innovative and did not stand out. It was only through his involvement with a group of literati samurai that Harunobu tackled new formats and styles.

In 1764, as a result of his social connections, he was chosen to aid these samurai in their amateur efforts to create e-goyomi. Calendars prints of this sort from prior to that year are not unknown but are quite rare, and it is known that Harunobu was close acquaintances or friends with many of the prominent artists and scholars of the period, as well as with several friends of the shōgun. Harunobu's calendars, which incorporated the calculations of the lunar calendar into their images, would be exchanged at Edo gatherings and parties.

These calendar prints would be the very first nishiki-e (brocade prints). As a result of the wealth and connoisseurship of his samurai patrons, Harunobu exclusively created these prints using the best materials available. Harunobu experimented with better woods for the woodblocks, using cherry wood instead of catalpa, and used not only more expensive colors, but also a thicker application of the colors, in order to achieve a more opaque effect.

The most important of Harunobu's innovations in the creation of nishiki-e was the use of multiple separate wood blocks in the creation of a single image, an expense afforded through the wealth of his clients. Just 20 years previously, the invention of benizuri-e had made it possible to print in three or four colors; Harunobu applied this new technique to ukiyo-e prints using up to ten different colors on a single sheet of paper. The new technique depended on using notches and wedges to hold the paper in place and keep the successive color printings in register. Harunobu was the first ukiyo-e artist to consistently use more than three colors in each print. Nishiki-e, unlike their predecessors, were full-color images. As the technique was first used in a calendar, the year of their origin can be traced precisely to 1765.

In the late 1760s, Harunobu thus became one of the primary producers of images of bijin-ga (pictures of beautiful women), actors of Edo and related subjects for the Edo print connoisseur market; however, he did not produce prints of kabuki actors, reported to have said, "Why should I paint pictures of such trash as Kabuki actors". In a few special cases, notably his famous set of eight prints entitled Zashiki hakkei (Eight Parlor Views), the patron's name appears on the print along with, or in place of, Harunobu's own. The Zashiki hakkei series exemplifies the mitate genre favoured by Harunobu, in which a traditional theme is playfully reimagined in a contemporary setting: it reworked the traditional Eight Views of Ōmi (Ōmi hakkei), scenes near Lake Biwa said to have been designated by the former regent Konoe in the early sixteenth century, which were themselves modelled on the Chinese theme of the Eight Views of Xiao and Xiang (Xiāoxiāng bājǐng), a set of landscapes in Hunan province traditionally associated with allegorical meanings such as exile or enlightenment. The presence of a patron's name or seal, and especially the omission of that of the artist, was another novel development in ukiyo-e of this time.

Between 1765 and 1770, Harunobu created over twenty illustrated books and over one thousand color prints, along with a number of paintings. He came to be regarded as the master of ukiyo-e during these last years of his life, and was widely imitated until, a number of years after his death, his style was eclipsed by that of new artists, including Katsukawa Shunshō and Torii Kiyonaga.

== Style ==
In addition to the revolutionary innovations that came with the introduction of nishiki-e, Harunobu's personal style was unique in a number of other respects. His figures are all very thin and light; some critics say that all his figures look like children. However, it is these same young girls who epitomize Harunobu's personal style. Richard Lane describes this as "Harunobu's special province, one in which he surpassed all other Japanese artists - eternal girlhood in unusual and poetic settings". Though his compositions, like most ukiyo-e prints, may be said to be fairly simple overall, it is the overall composition that concerned Harunobu. Unlike many of his predecessors, he did not seek to have the girls' kimono dominate the viewer's attention.

Harunobu is also acclaimed as being one of the greatest artists of this period in depicting ordinary urban life in Edo. His subjects are not restricted to geisha, courtesans, actors, and sumo wrestlers, but include street vendors, errand boys, and others who help to fill in the gaps in describing the culture of this time. His work is rich in literary allusion, and he often quotes Japanese classical poetry, but the accompanying illustrations often gently poke fun at the subject.

Many of his prints have a solid, single-color background, created by a technique called tsubushi. Though many other artists used the same technique, Harunobu is generally regarded as having used it to the strongest effect. The colored background sets a mood and tone for the entire image.

== Collections ==
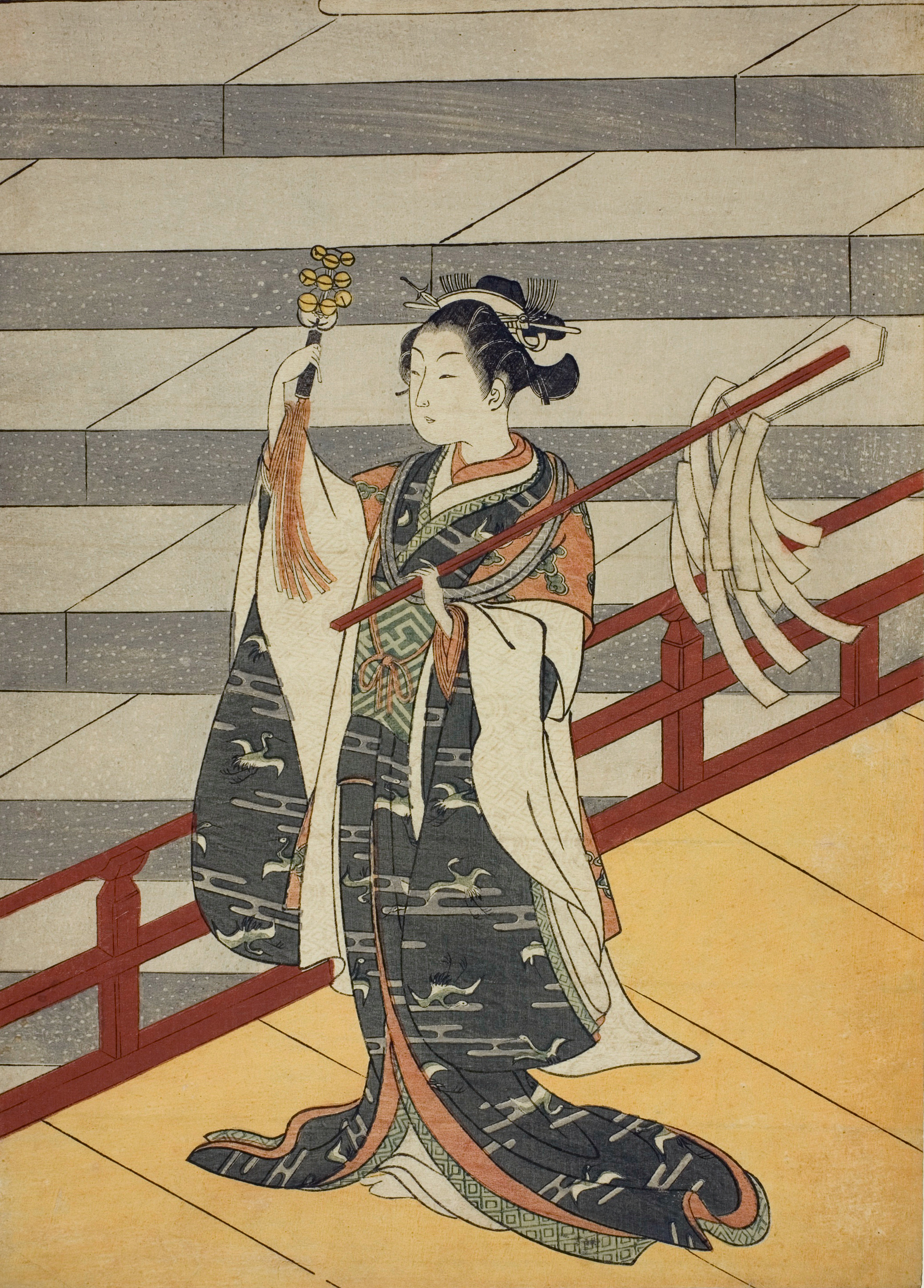
The Kagura Dancer, circa 1766

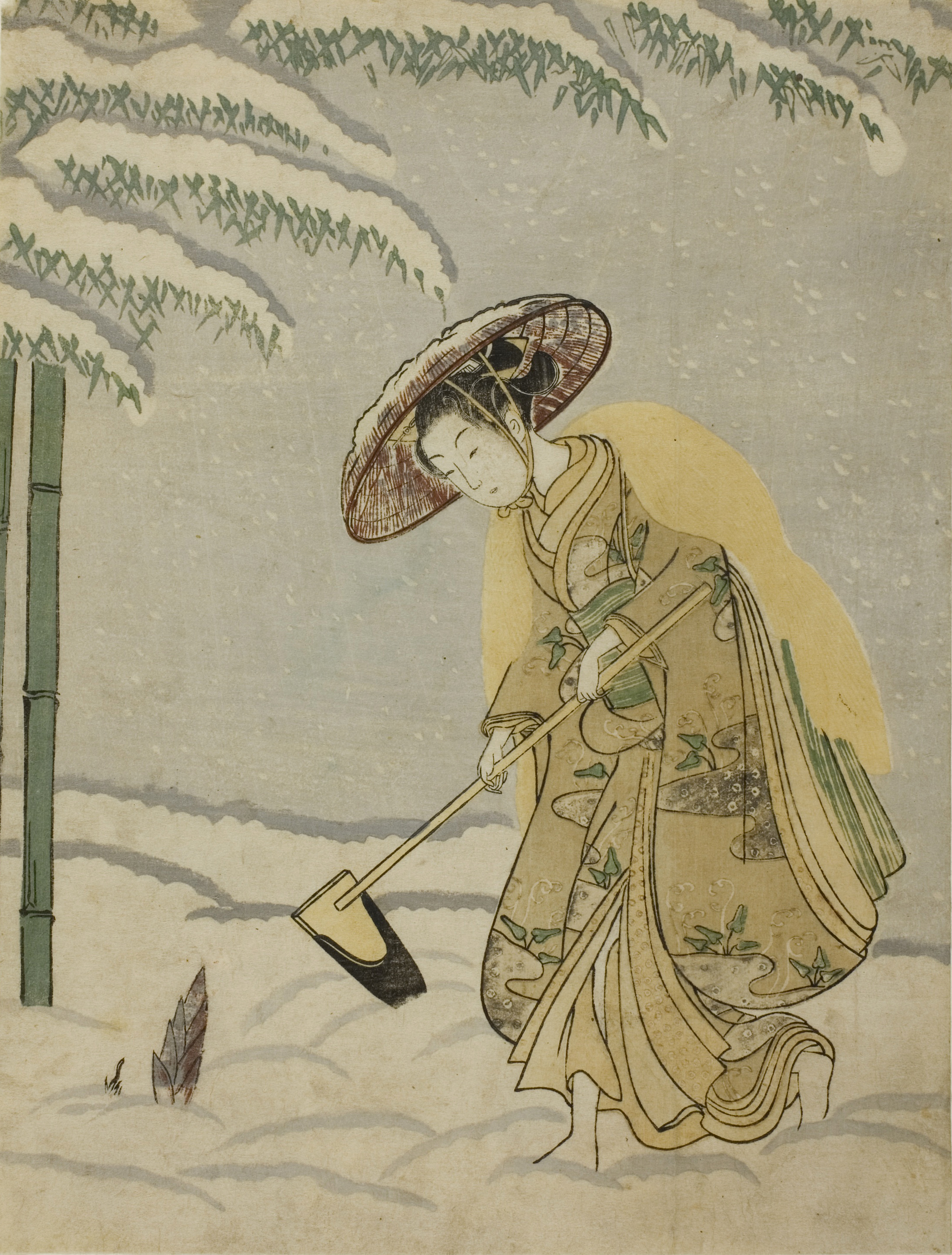
Woman gathering bamboo shoots, circa 1765

Harunobu's work is held in several museums worldwide, including:

- Asian Art Museum
- British Museum
- Brooklyn Museum
- Harvard Art Museums
- Hill-Stead Museum
- Kislak Collection of Japanese Prints
- Metropolitan Museum of Art
- Museum of Fine Arts, Boston
- National Museum of Korea
- Nelson-Atkins Museum of Art
- Philadelphia Museum of Art
- Portland Art Museum
- Suntory Museum of Art
- University of Michigan Museum of Art
- Victoria and Albert Museum
- Virginia Museum of Fine Arts

== In philately ==
Harunobu's works have been featured three times in commemorative postage stamps issued by the Japanese post office:

- 1957 Philatelic Week
- 1969 16th Universal Postal Union Congress
- 1981 Philatelic Week (se-tenant pair)
- 2021 Philanippon
- 2022 Philately Week

His works have also been depicted in topical stamps from Ajman, Antigua and Barbuda, Dominica, Fujeira, Gambia, Guyana, Hungary, Kathiri State of Seiyun, Liberia, Mahra State, the Federated States of Micronesia, Paraguay, St Vincent, Sharjah, Sierra Leone, Turks and Caicos, United Nations Vienna, Vietnam and Yemen.

== Works ==
Harunobu

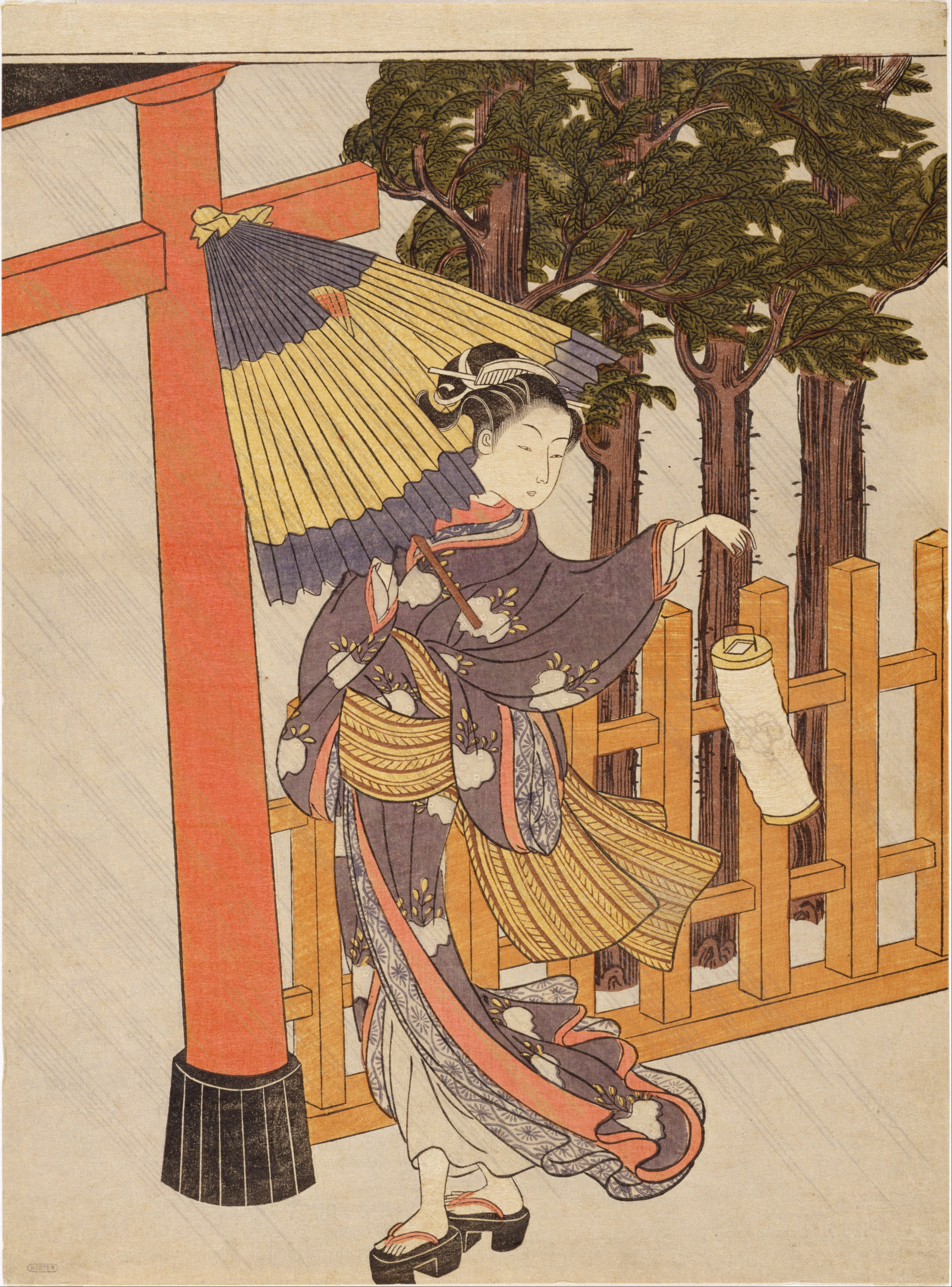
Woman Visiting the Shrine in the Night

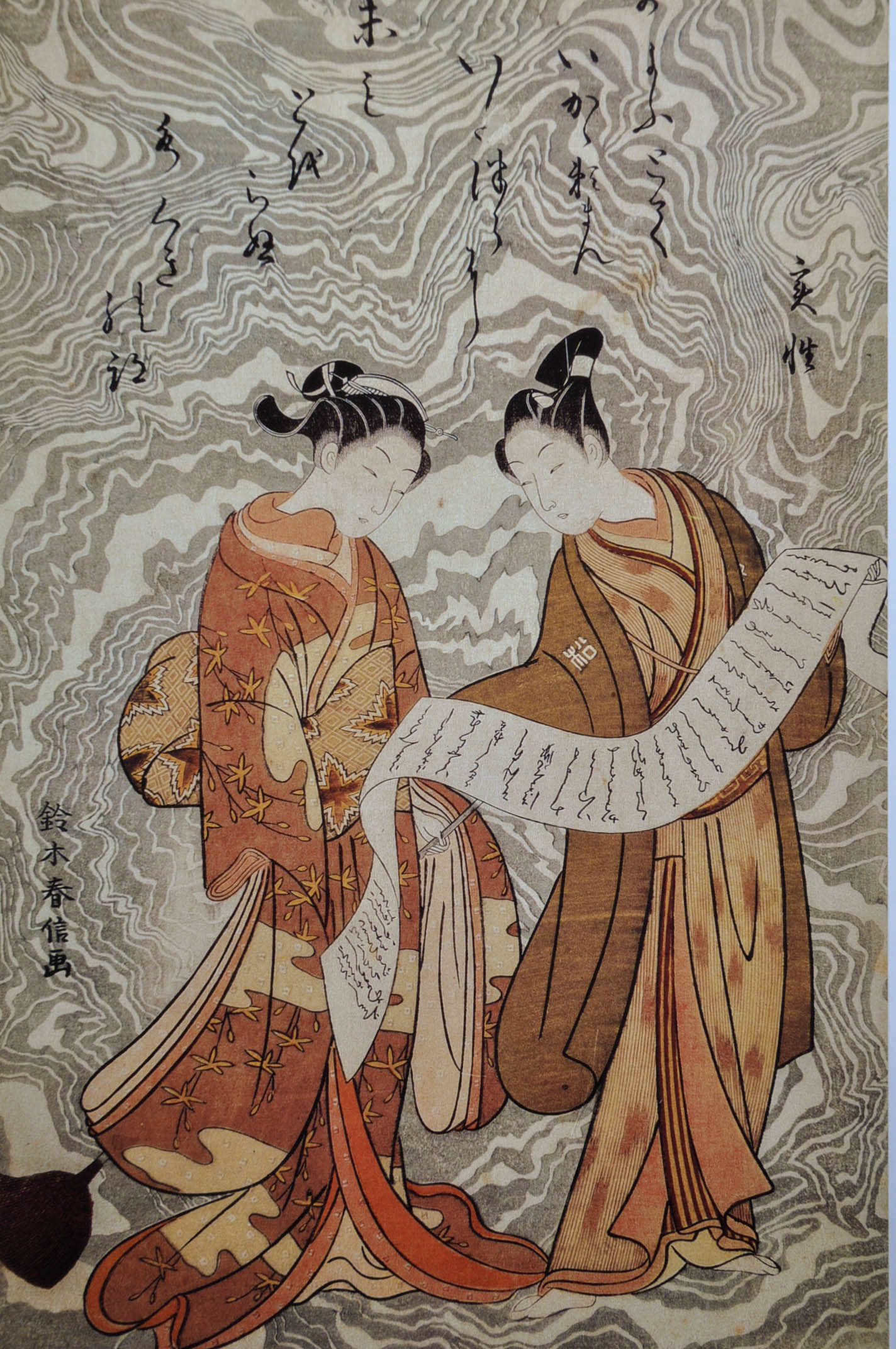
Kanzan and Jittoku, the well known Chinese Buddhist monk

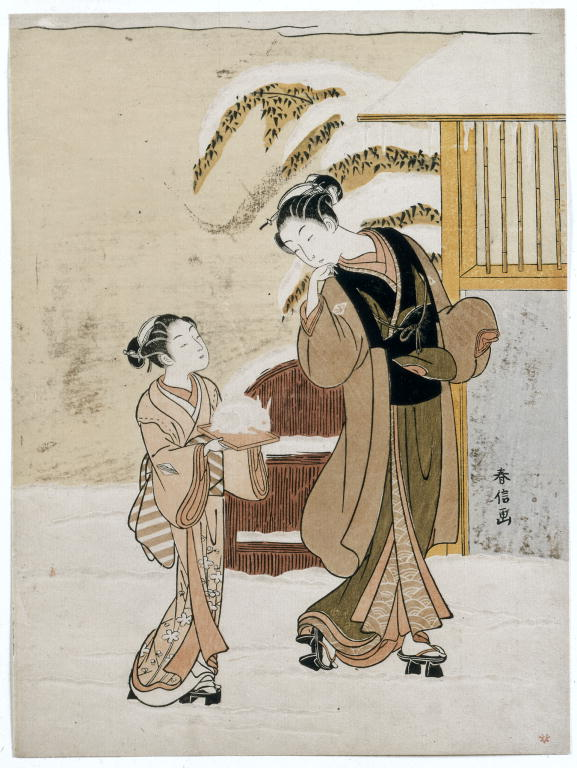
Young Woman Admiring a Snow Rabbit

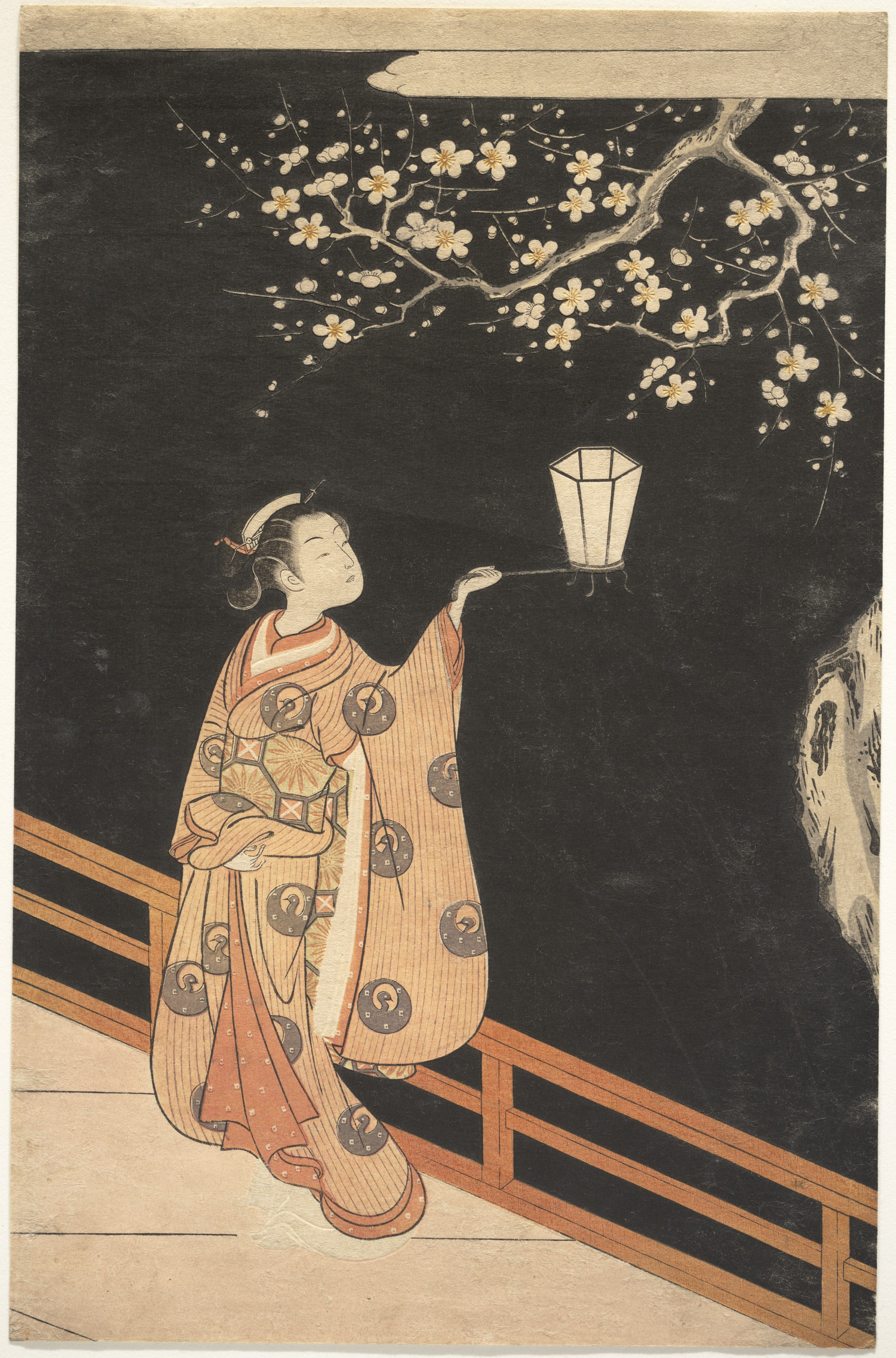
Woman Admiring Plum Blossoms at Night

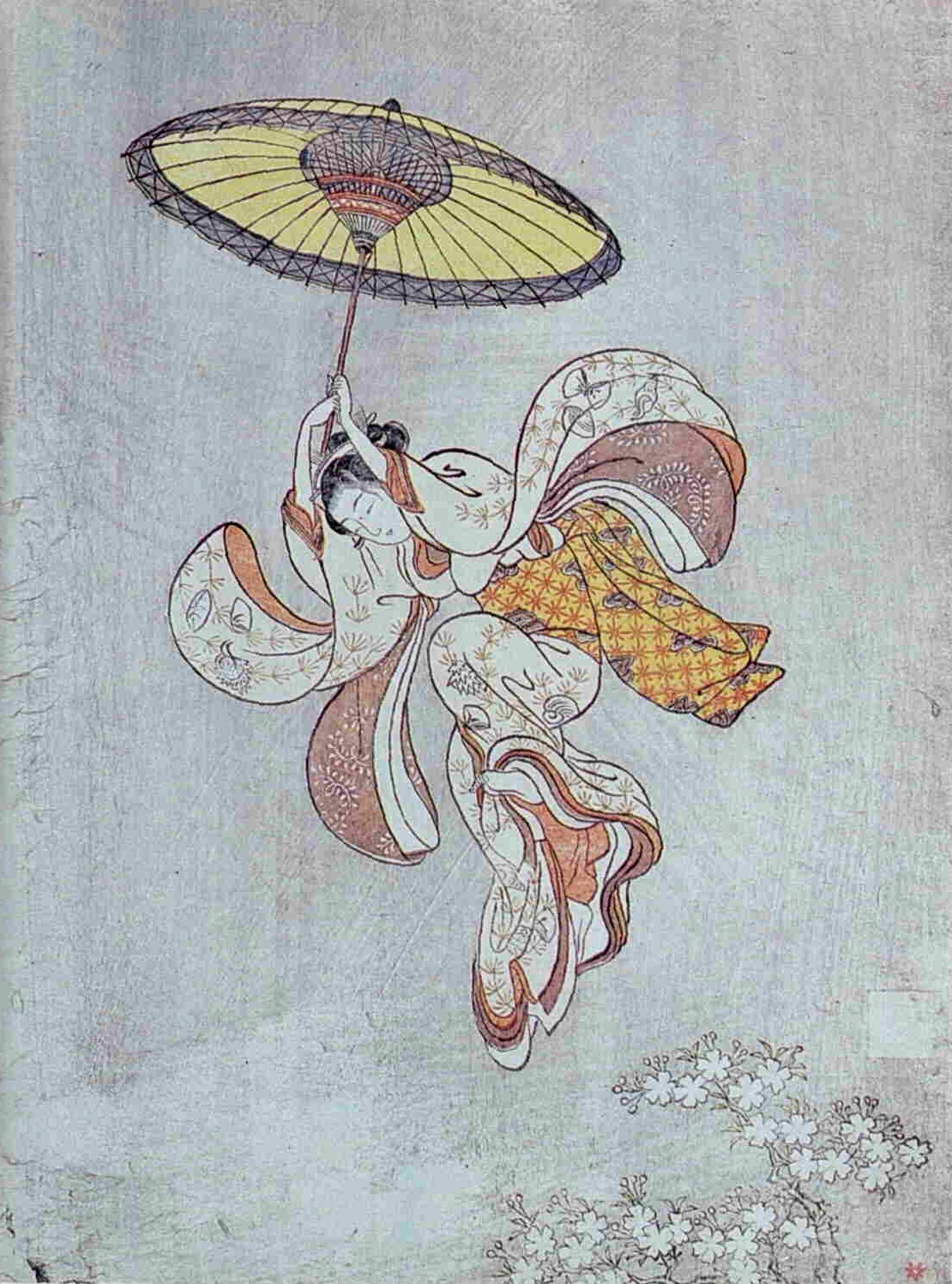
Girl jumps from Kiyomizu-dera

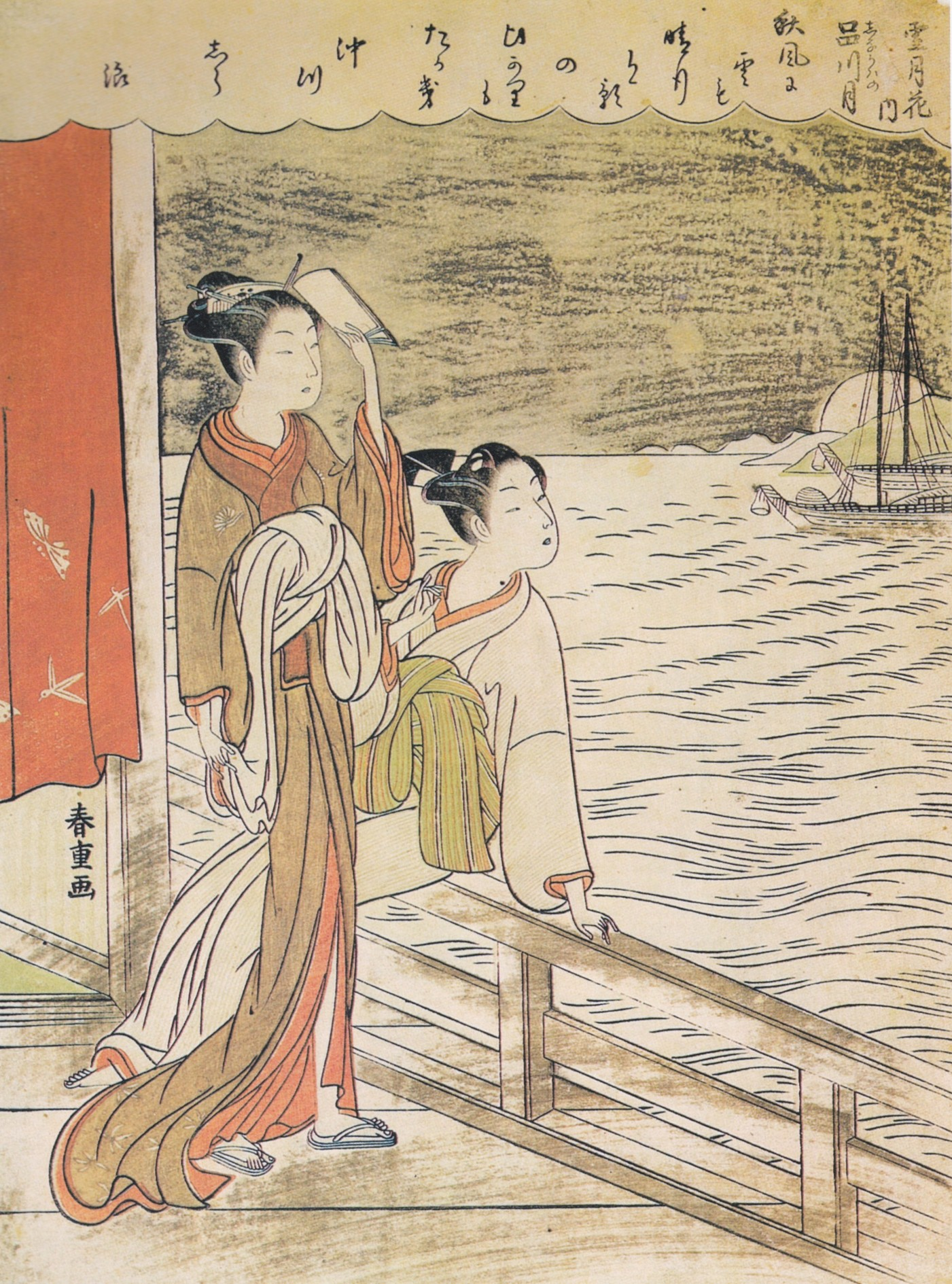
Moon rising at Shinagawa

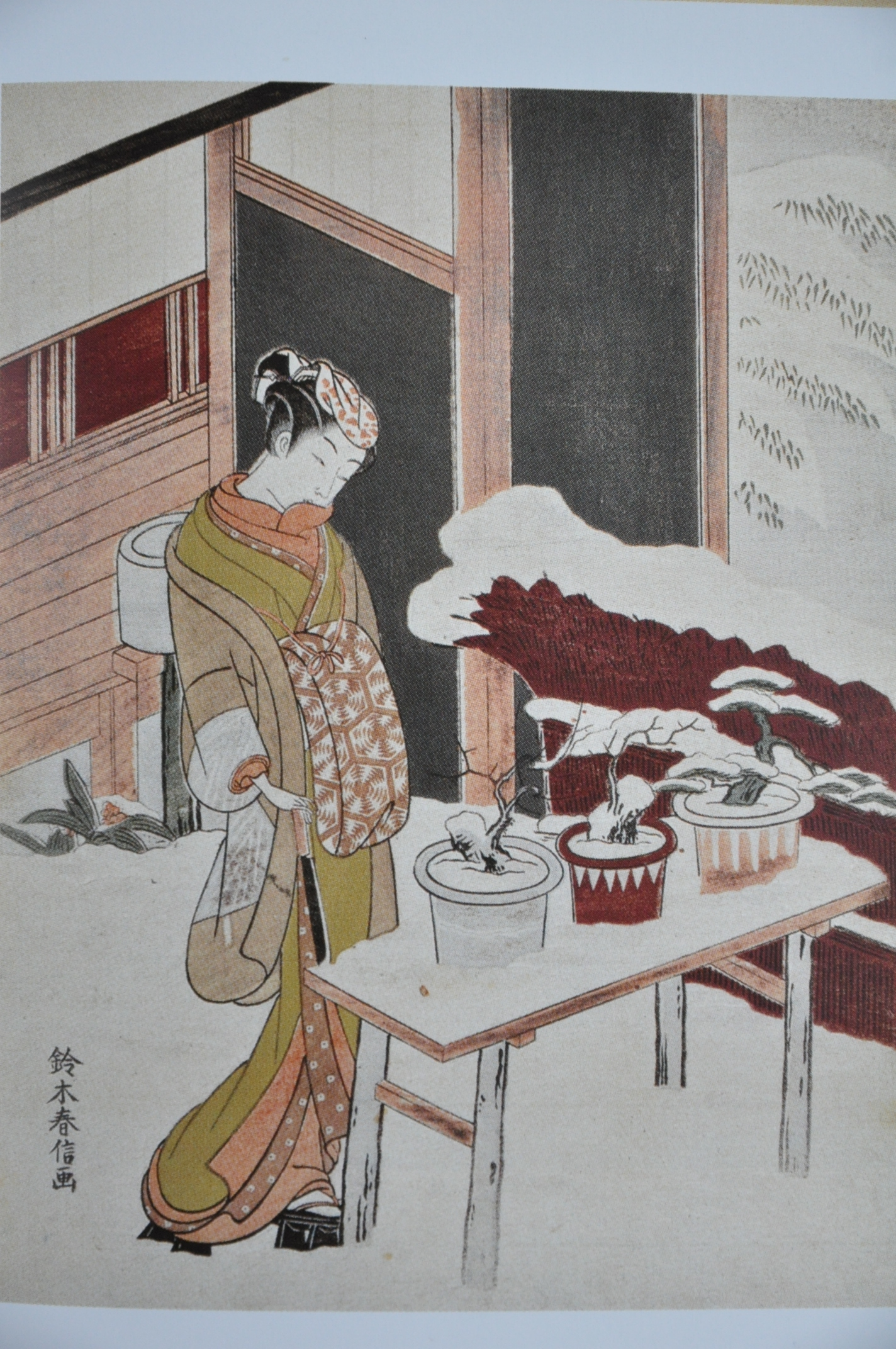
Potted trees in snow (Hachi no ki)

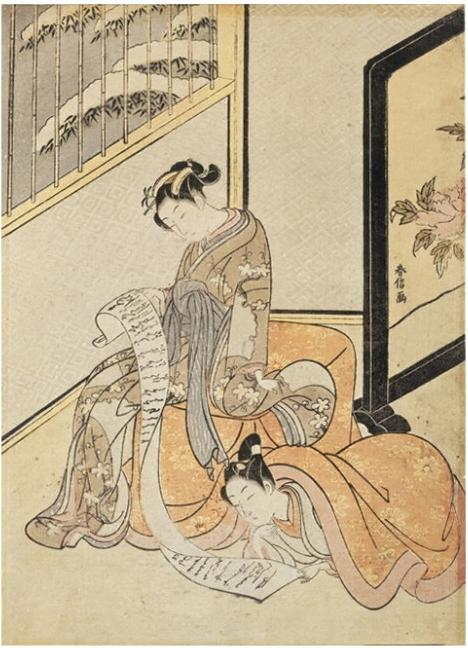
Intimate scene in an apartment in the Yoshiwara

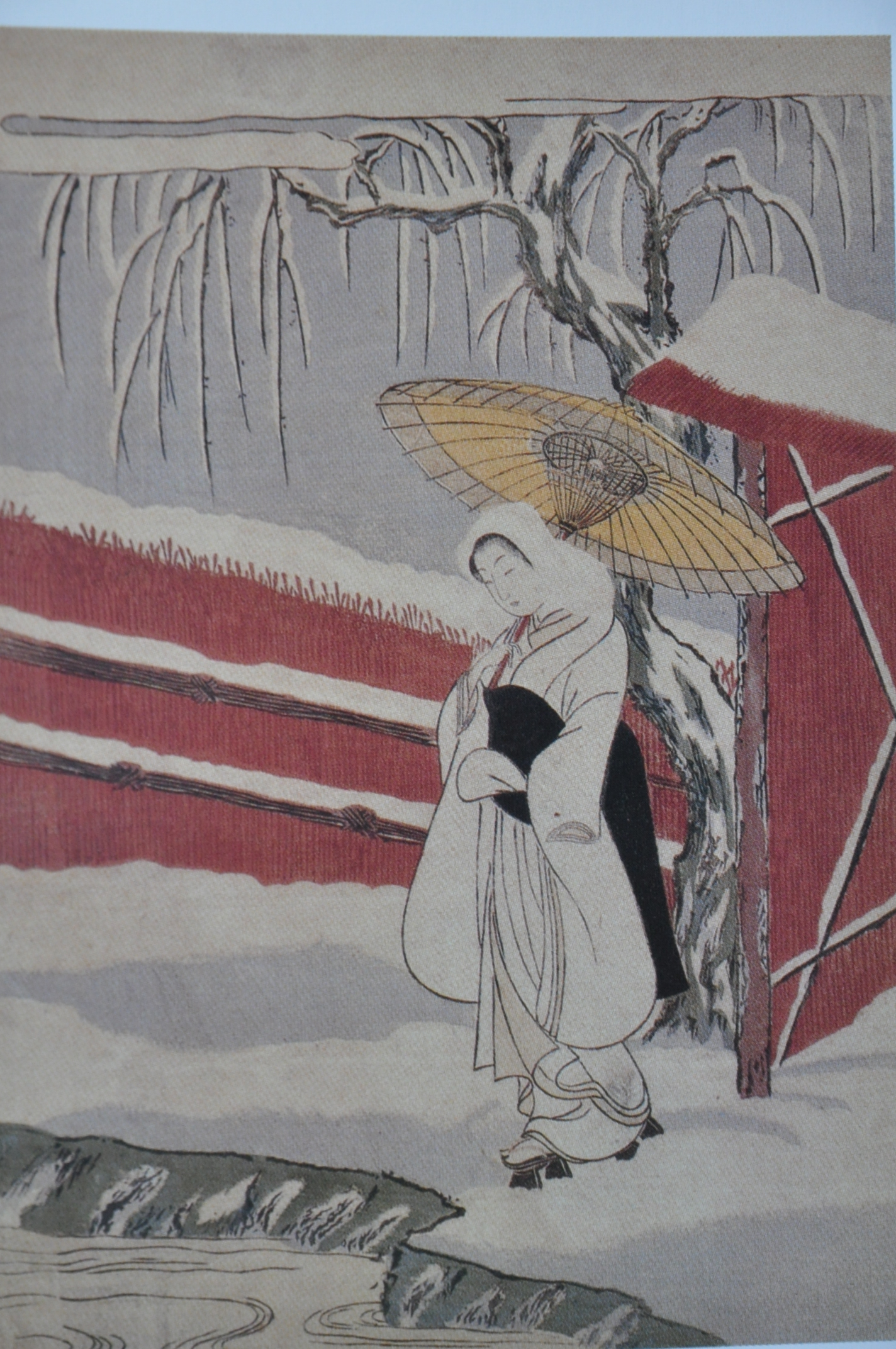
Young girl in the snow

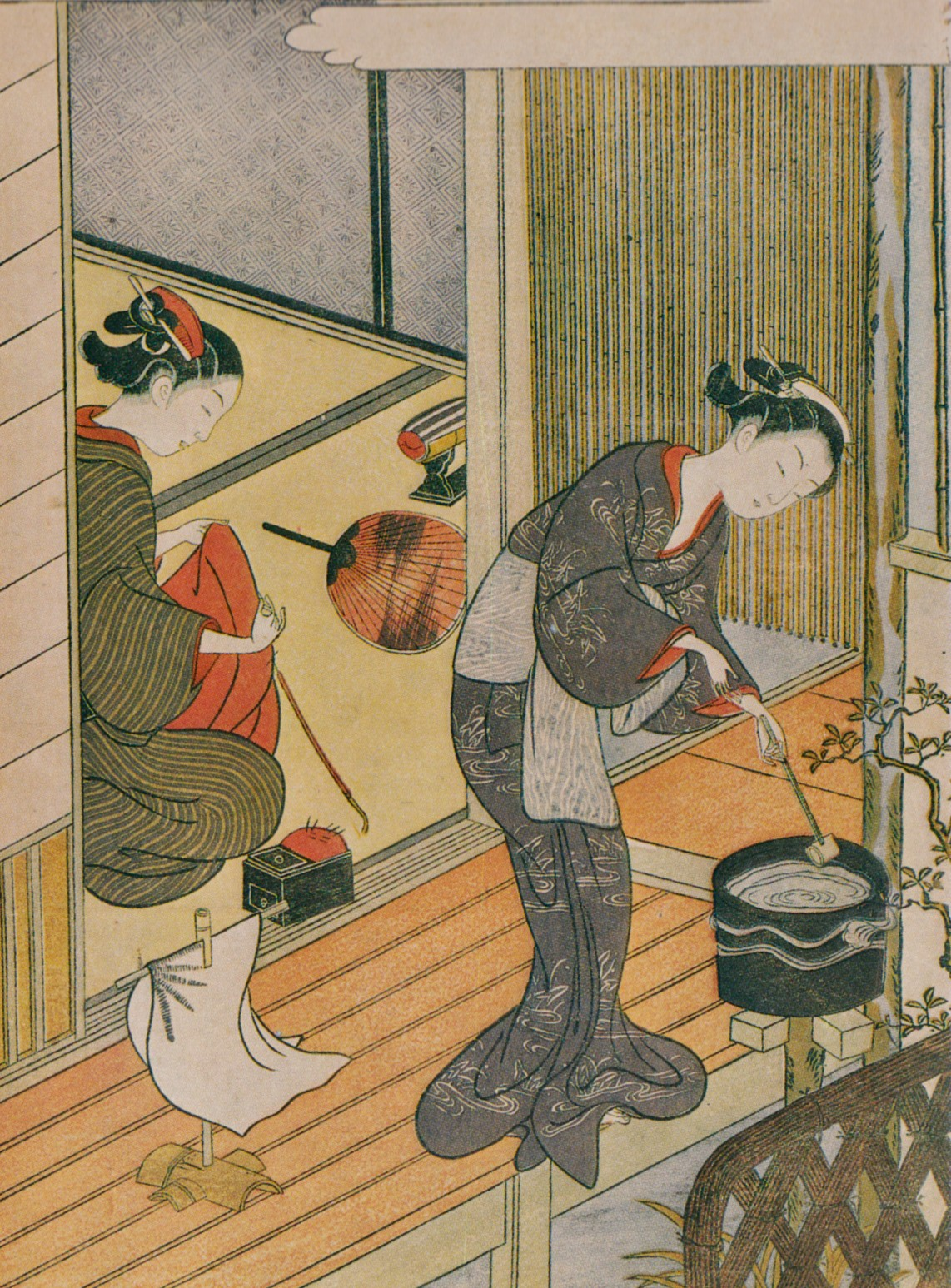
Returning sails of the towel rack, Zashiki hakkei series
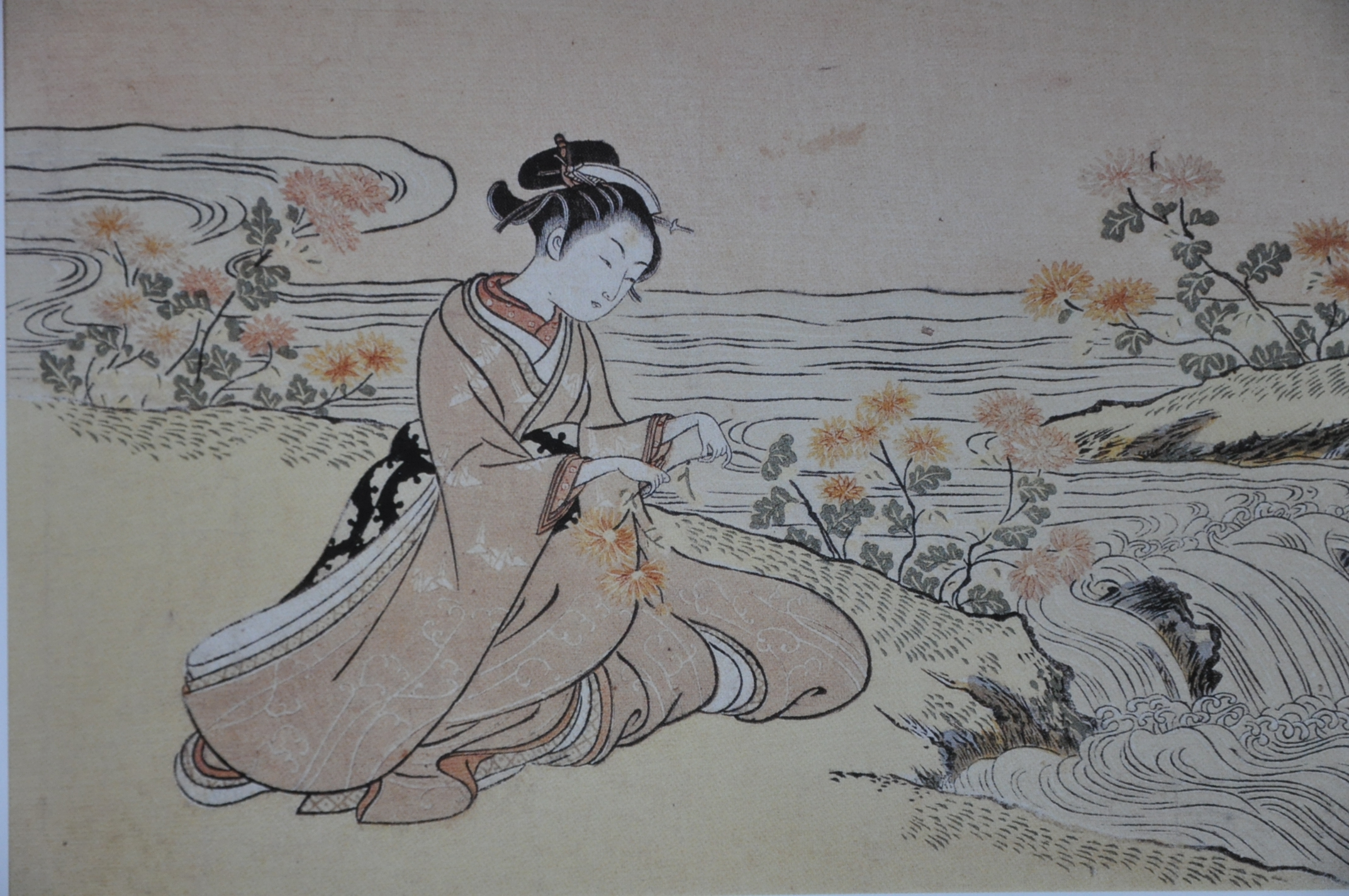
Based on the Chinese legend of Ju Citong (Kikujidô), a young man (shown in the guise of a girl) is forced into exile, having learned the secret of eternal life.

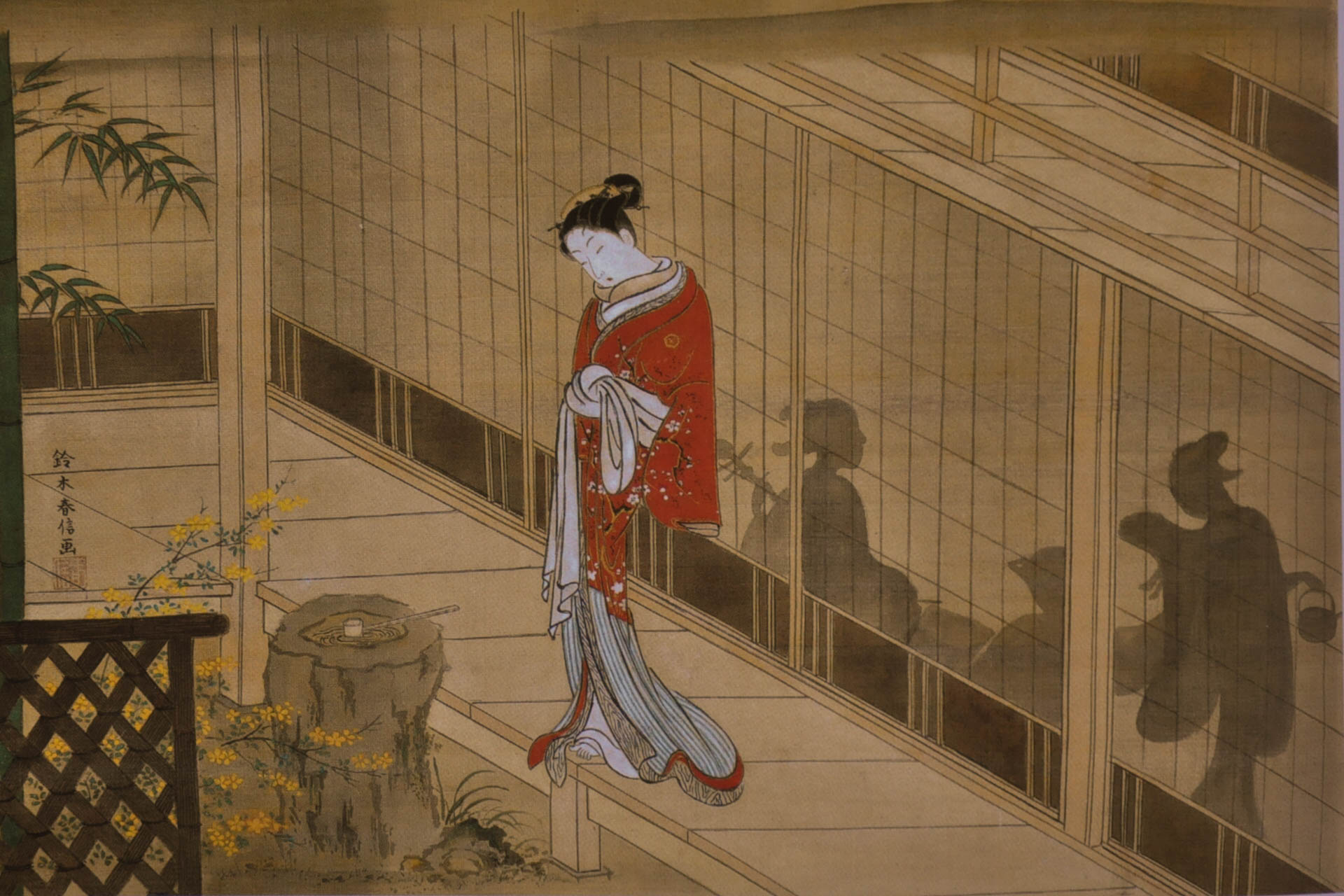
A courtesan after being absent from a joyful meeting, in which we see a geisha playing shamisen looming in silhouette on the shōji behind her.

== Notes ==
=== Works cited ===
- Forbes, Andrew; Henley, David (2012). Suzuki Harunobu: 100 Beauties. Chiang Mai: Cognoscenti Books. ASIN: B00AC2NB8Y
- Hayakawa, Monta (2001). "Explanations of the Illustrations in the Fūryū zashiki hakkei" (PDF). The Shunga of Suzuki Harunobu: Mitate-e and Sexuality in Edo. Nichibunken Monograph Series. Vol. 4. Translated by Fister, Patricia J. Nichibunken, International Research Center for Japanese Studies. pp. 89–104.
- Kurth, Julius. Suzuki Harunobu. Munchen: R. Piper & Co., 1923. ASIN: B000K0A7DK
- Kondo, Ichitaro. Suzuki Harunobu (Kodansha Library of Japanese Art Vol. 7). Charles E. Tuttle (1956). ASIN: B0007KFY7C
- Lane, Richard. (1978). Images from the Floating World, The Japanese Print. Oxford: Oxford University Press. ISBN 9780192114471; OCLC 5246796
- Waterhouse, David B. "Harunobu". Kodansha Encyclopedia of Japan. (vol. 3); Tokyo: Kodansha Ltd. 1983.Sisto Pascale
