= Nishikawa Sukenobu =

Japanese printmaker (1671–1750)

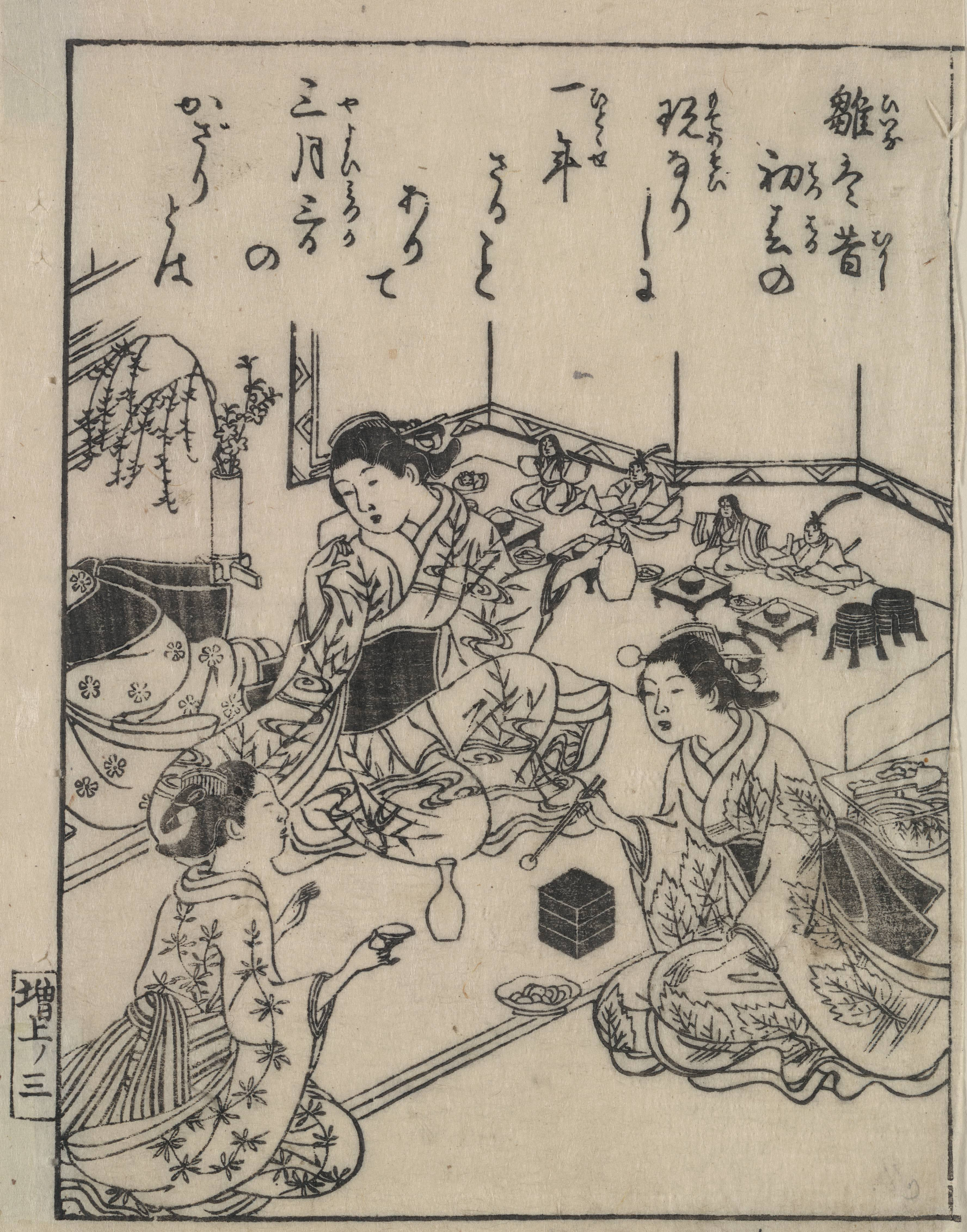
The Doll Ceremony

Nishikawa Sukenobu (西川 祐信; 1671 – August 20, 1750), often called simply "Sukenobu", was a Japanese printmaker from Kyoto. He was unusual for an ukiyo-e artist, as he was based in the imperial capital of Kyoto. He did prints of actors, but gained note for his works concerning women. His Hyakunin joro shinasadame (Appreciating 100 women), in two volumes published in 1723, depicted women of all classes, from the empress to prostitutes, and received favorable results.

== Life and career ==
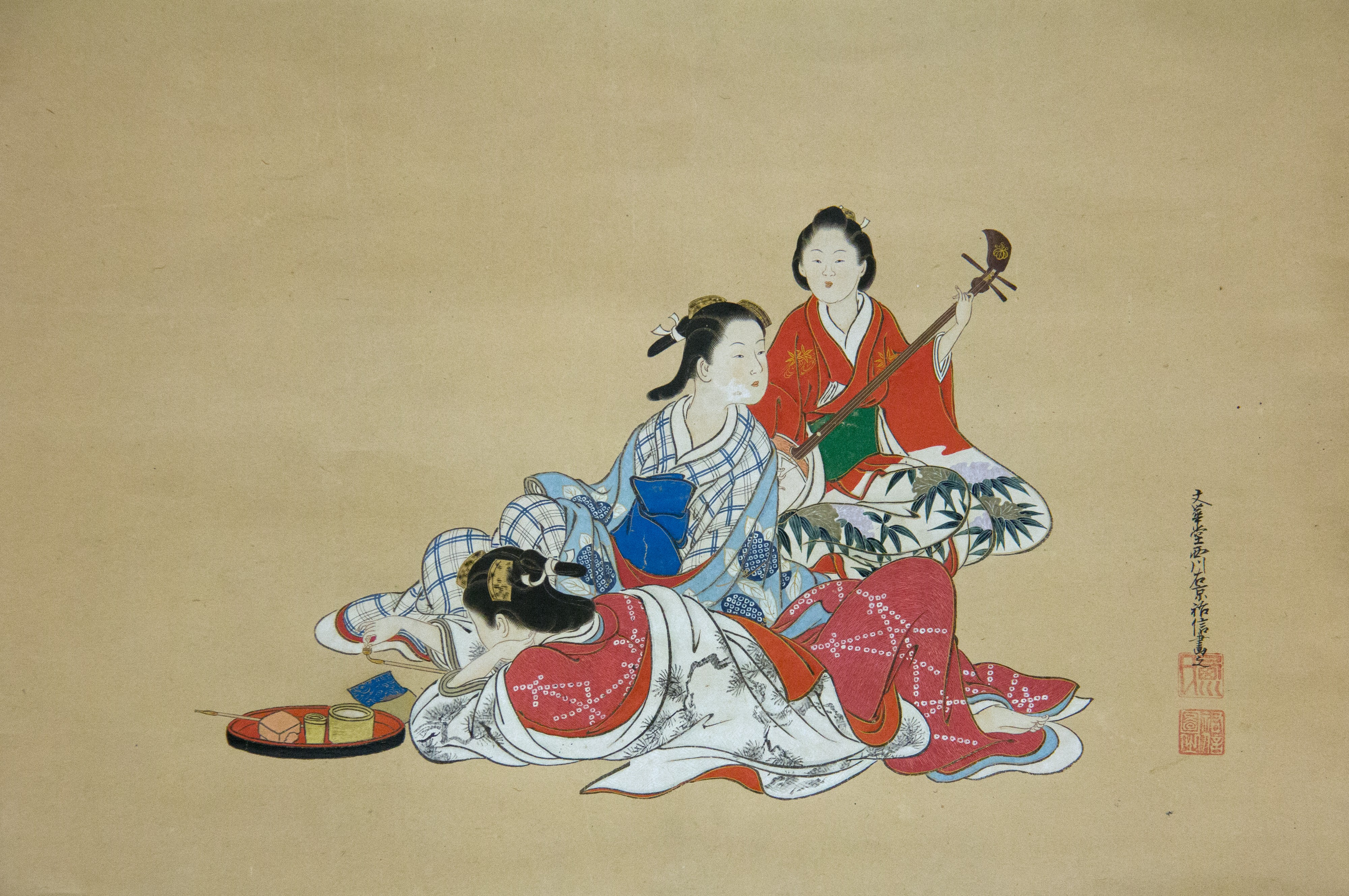
Hanging scroll by Nishikawa Sukenobu, c. 1700s.

Nishikawa Sukenobu was born in Kyoto in 1671 and studied painting there under Kanō Einō of the Kanō school of painting; he may also have studied under Tosa Mitsusuke of the Tosa school. Sukenobu's earliest known works are book illustrations that date to 1699; the earliest signed in his name is the seven-volume Shin Kanninki ("New patience story"). While most ukiyo-e artists were based in Edo (modern Tokyo), Sukenobu spent his career in Kyoto.

Sukenobu specialized in depictions of female beauties from different classes in their daily lives. He also produced books of kimono patterns, Musha-e portraits of warriors, illustrations of classical literature, and paintings. In his kimono-pattern books, Sukenobu revived the bon hinagata layout first published in 1662, introducing new dyeing techniques in which the silk was hand-painted.

Sukenobu died in Kyoto on 20 August 1750. He was also known under the names Uemon, Jitokusō, Jitokusai, Bunkado, Ukyō, Saiō. The influence of his style of depicting women is seen in the works of such artists as Suzuki Harunobu and Kitao Shigemasa. His depictions of young women with soft, rounded forms wearing splendid kimono, set within simple but clearly structured compositions, were also an influence on both Chōbunsai Eishi and Kitagawa Utamaro.

== Collections ==
Sukenobu's work is held in the permanent collections of several institutions, including the Dallas Museum of Art, the Carnegie Museum of Art, the Indianapolis Museum of Art, the Harvard Art Museums, the University of Michigan Museum of Art, the Seattle Art Museum, the Suntory Museum of Art, the Metropolitan Museum of Art, the Brooklyn Museum, the Museum of Fine Arts, Boston, and the Philadelphia Museum of Art.
