= Tsukioka Settei =

Japanese artist (1710–1787)

Tsukioka Settei (月岡 雪鼎, 1710 – 22 January 1787) was a Japanese ukiyo-e artist.

Settei was born in Ōmi Province and studied painting in Osaka in the style of the Kanō school under Takada Keiho. He was strongly influenced by the work of the ukiyo-e artist Nishikawa Sukenobu. Settei skilfully combined the styles of Moronobu and Sukenobu, though he never quite achieved the genius of either of his models; his output covers a large number of book illustrations and paintings, particularly on classic Japanese subjects treated partly in the ukiyo-e manner, reflecting the tastes of Kyoto and Osaka, where the Imperial Court and its culture remained an important cultural presence. Settei produced a number of printed works, but his bijin-ga paintings of female beauties are considered his most representative works.

Works by Tsukioka Settei

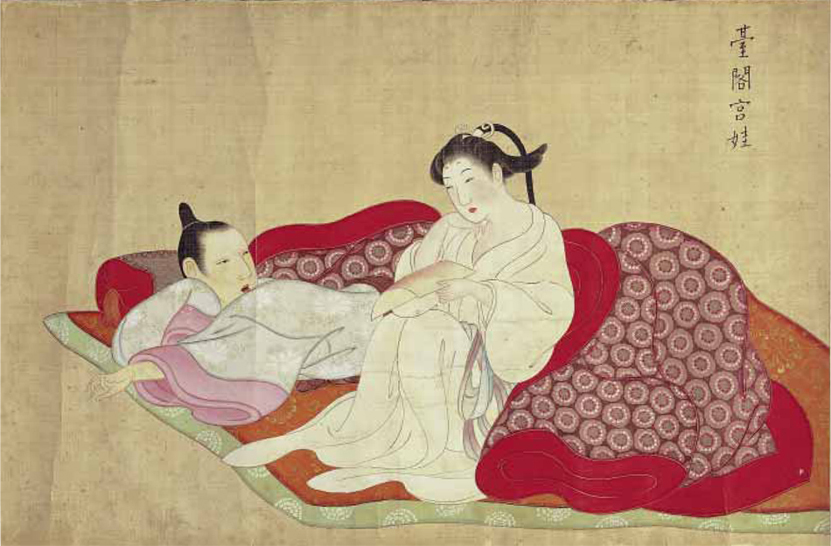

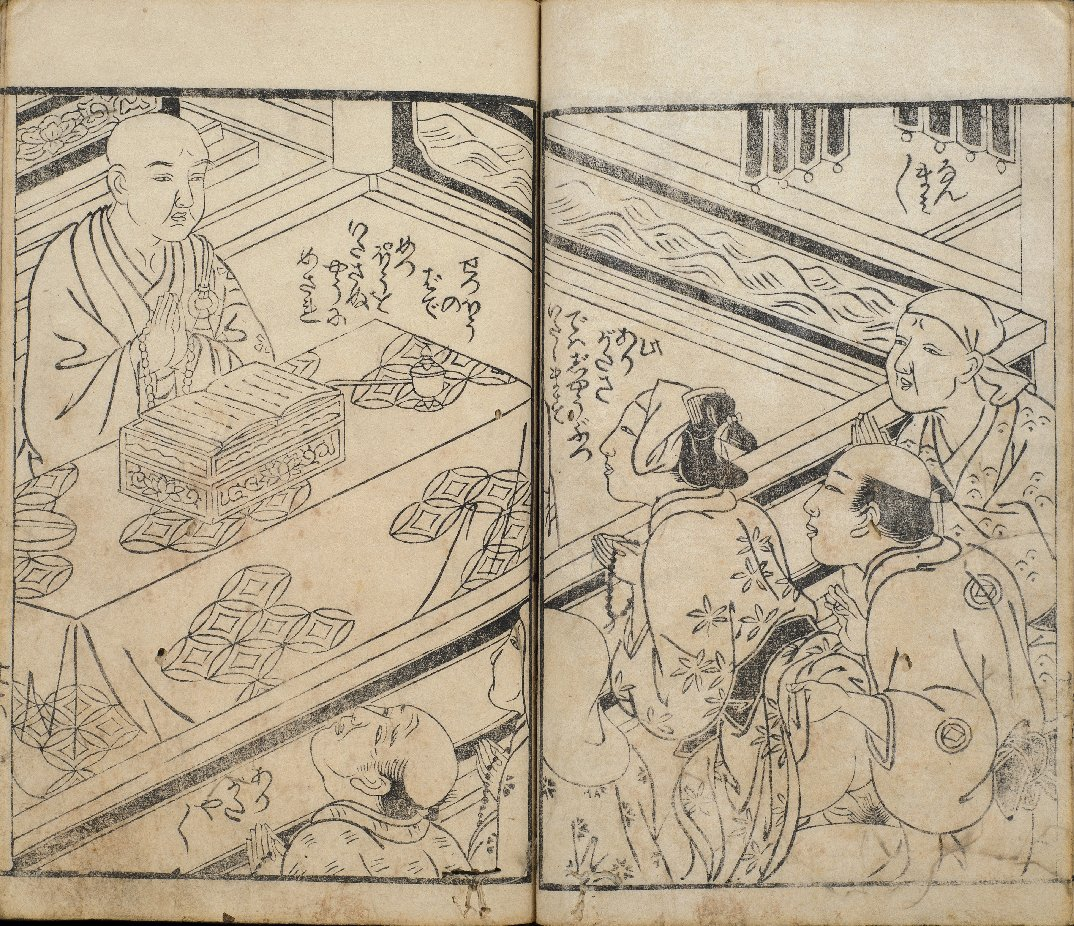

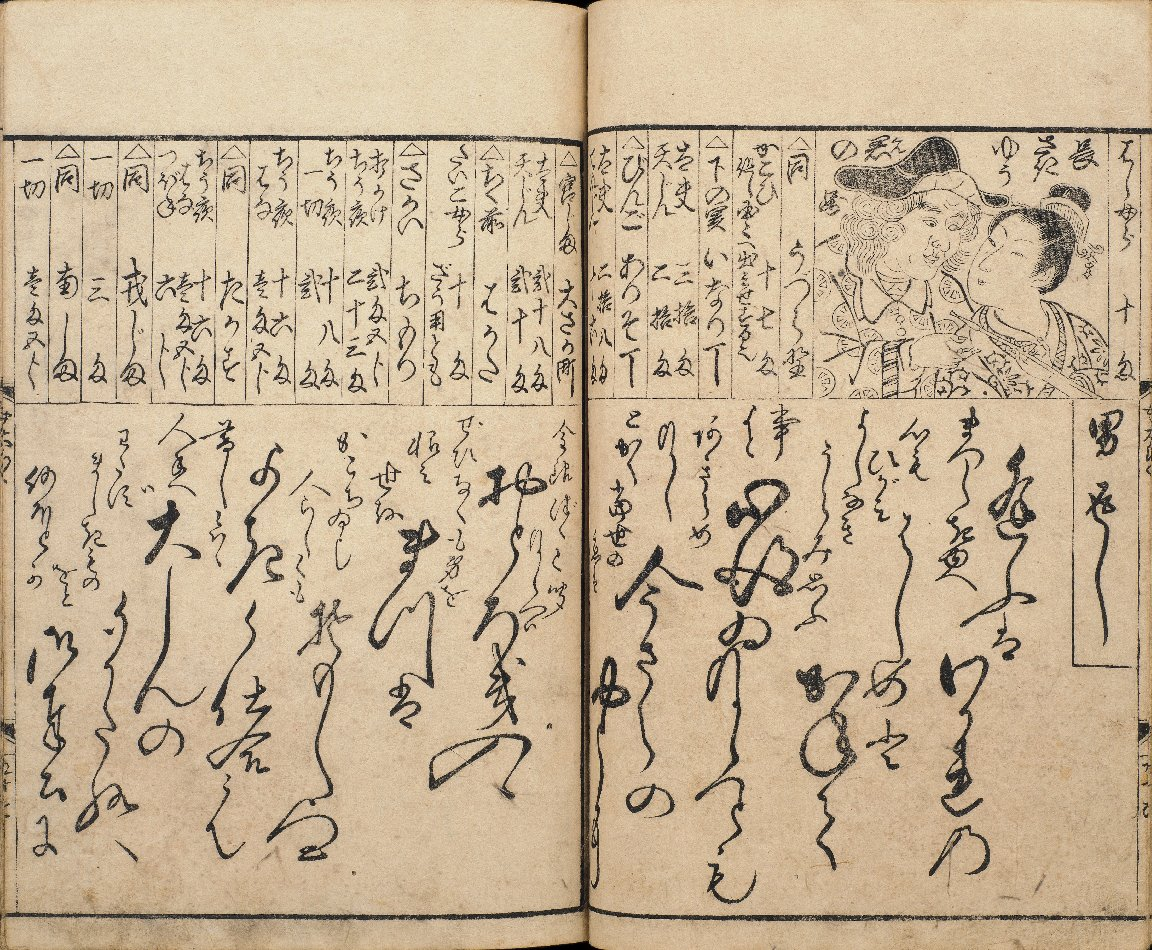

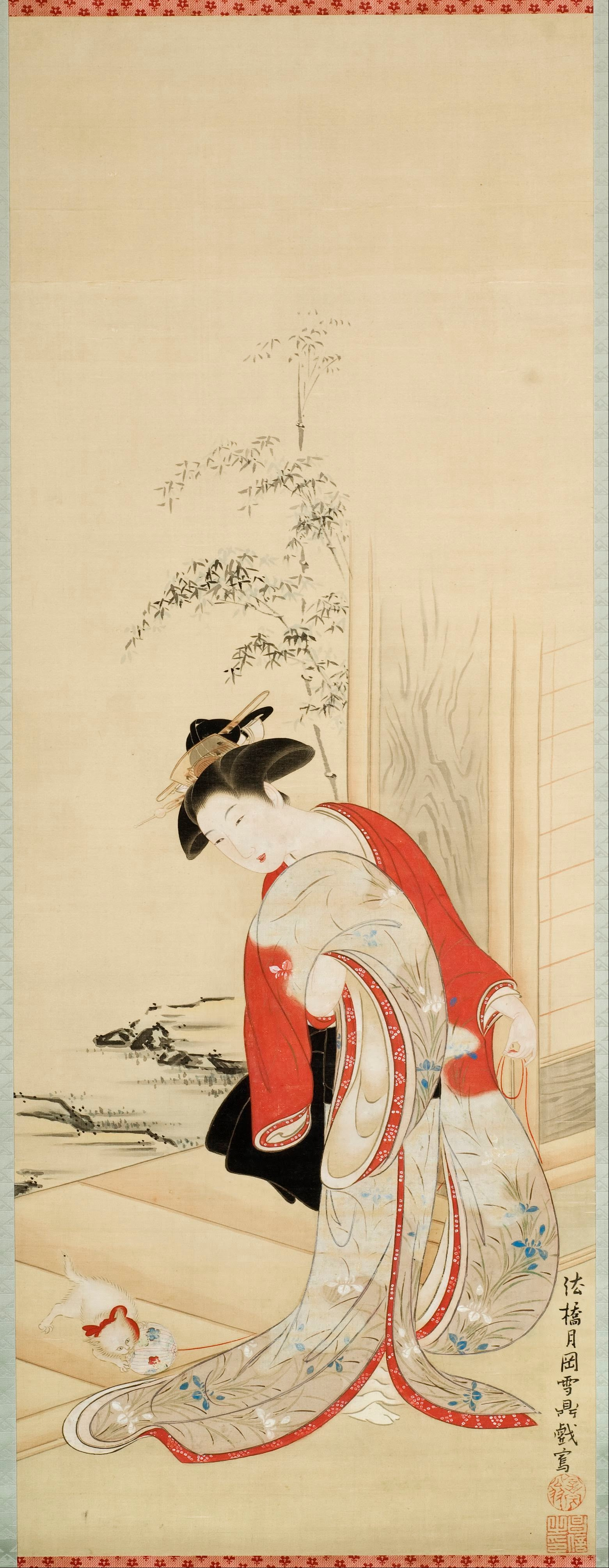

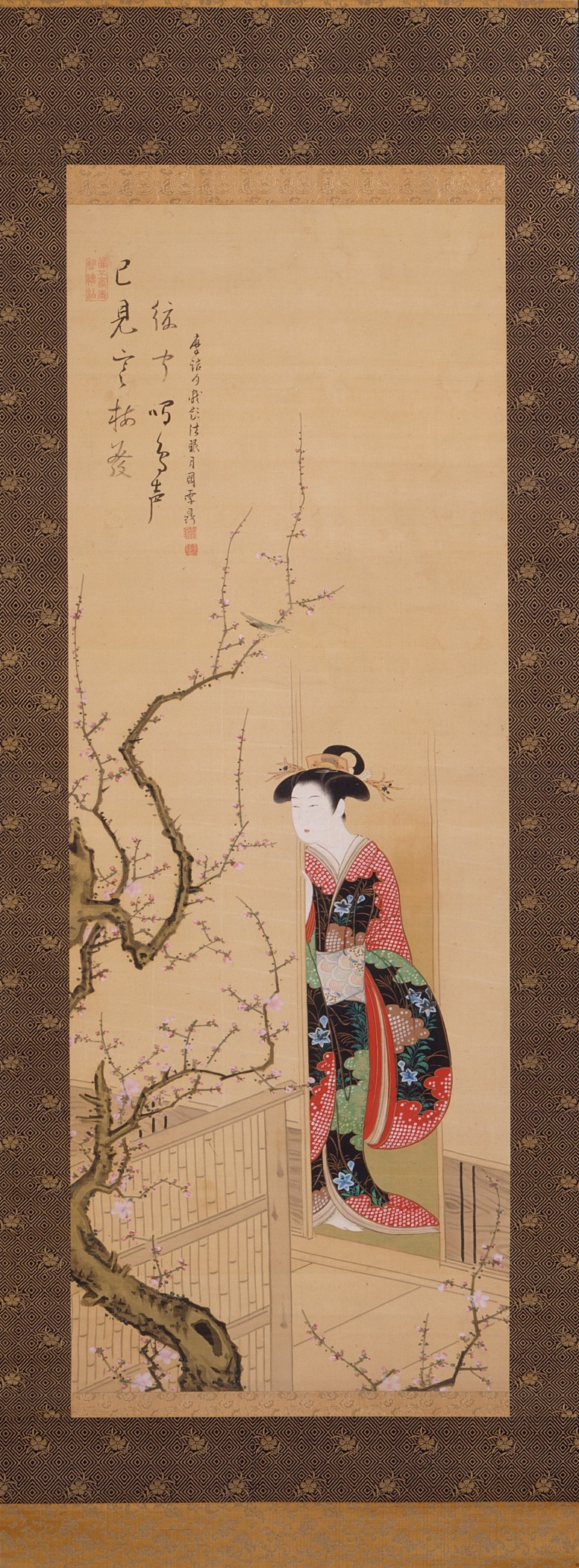
