= Nishiki-e =

Japanese multi-colored woodblock printing

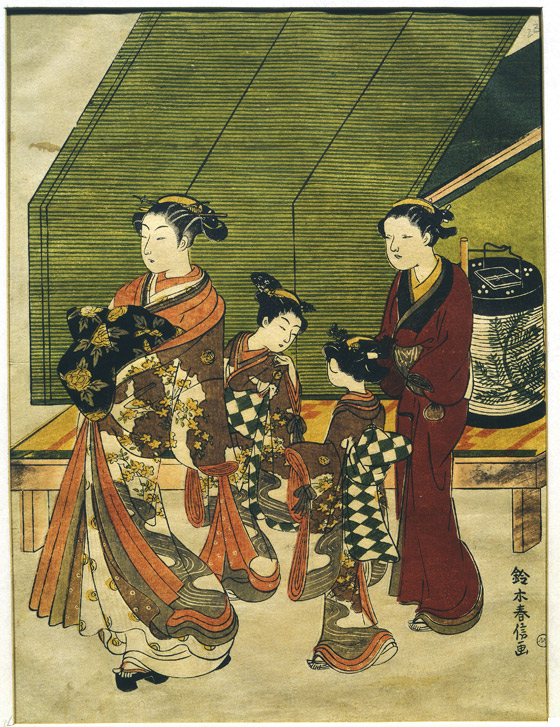
Suzuki Harunobu (about 1724–1770), "Parading Courtesan with Attendants", Late 1760, Nishiki-e (brocade print) V&A Museum no. E.1416–1898

Nishiki-e (錦絵; "brocade picture") is a type of Japanese multi-coloured woodblock printing; the technique is used primarily in ukiyo-e. It was invented in the 1760s, and perfected and popularized by the printmaker Suzuki Harunobu, who produced many nishiki-e prints between 1765 and his death five years later.

Previously, most prints had been in black-and-white, coloured by hand, or coloured with the addition of one or two colour ink blocks. A nishiki-e print is created by carving a separate woodblock for every colour, and using them in a stepwise fashion. An engraver by the name of Kinroku is credited with the technical innovations that allowed so many blocks of separate colours to fit together perfectly on the page, in order to create a single complete image.

Harunobu himself contributed to the technique's refinement by using superior materials, including cherry wood blocks in place of the more common catalpa, and a thicker application of pigment to achieve an opaque effect. While the earlier benizuri-e technique, introduced some twenty years before, had allowed printing in only three or four colours, Harunobu's nishiki-e could combine five to eight, occasionally as many as ten, colour blocks on a single sheet.

This style and technique is also known as Edo-e (江戸絵, edo-e), referring to Edo, the name for Tokyo before it became the capital.

== Edo Era ==
Nishiki-e is also known as Edo-e, or azuma-nishiki-e. The technology to produce nishiki-e made printing complex colors and figures easy. It became a popular commodity during Edo period. Due to the increasing number of nishiki-e shops during the era, the price of a nishiki-e dropped to an affordable 16 to 32 mon.

== Meiji Era ==
In the Meiji period, various nishiki-e illustrated new fashions, imported goods, events, the railroad, and other new topics. "Newspaper nishiki-e" (新聞錦絵, shinbun nishiki-e) were very popular among the public during this period. Print designers created nishiki-e on topics picked up from the newspapers such as Tōkyō Nichinichi Shinbun or Yūbin Hōchi Shinbun.

Woodblock prints soared in popularity during the first Sino-Japanese War (1894–1895), with 3,000 prints produced during this nine-month period. These prints generally glorified the Japanese army while denigrating the Chinese. And the bright colours in the prints, exciting scenes, and inexpensive nature made them a notable alternative to the black and white photographs of the time.

== Taisho Era ==
Some of the most well-known printmakers in Taisho Period include Yamamoto Noboru, Ohara Kofun, and Sakamaki Kogyo. Overall, the amount of Nishiki-e print production decreased greatly in comparison to Meiji Period.
