= Tsuko =

Tsuko may refer to:

- 6599 Tsuko a main-belt asteroid named after Tsuko Nakamura (b. 1943)
- Tsuko Nakamura (born 1943), Japanese astronomer and discoverer of minor planets
- Tsūkō ichiran, a compilation of Japanese documents about foreign relations
- Tsuko Station a Japanese train station located in Ogōri, Fukuoka
