= Tosa Mitsusuke =

Japanese artist

Tosa Mitsusuke

Tosa Mitsusuke (土佐光祐; 1675–1710) was a Japanese artist in the middle period of the Edo era. He was the 18th head of the Tosa school.

== Tosa school ==
Painters that belonged to the Tosa were good at painting in the Yamato-e style. Successive heads of the Tosa served the Emperors as edokoro-azukari (Official court painter).

== Biography ==
In 1696, he succeeded his father's occupation and became an official court painter. In 1709, he did paintings of room partitions in the royal palace and in the Sento palace with Kano Tsunenobu. He died in 1710 at the age of 36.

== Family ==
His father was Tosa Mitsunari.
