= Sanogawa Ichimatsu =

Japanese actor

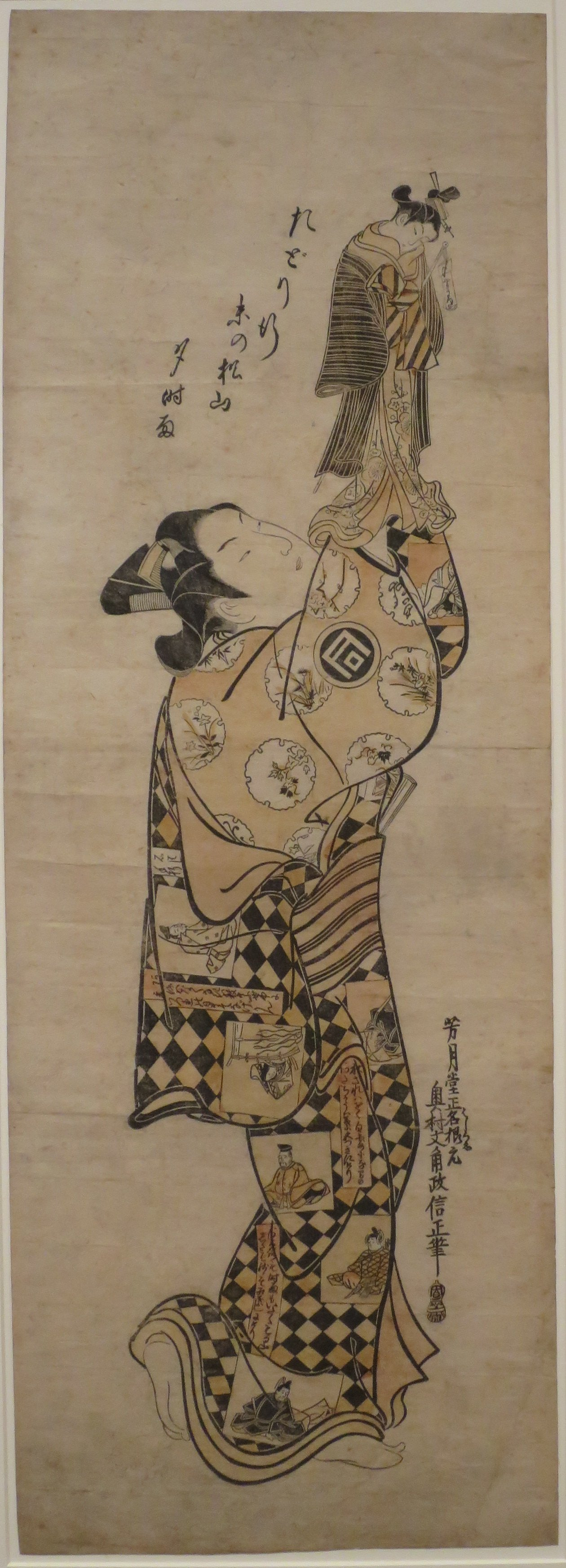
- Sanogawa Ichimatsu with Puppet.
- Born: 1722; Fushimi, Yamashiro, Japan
- Died: 1762 (aged 39–40)
- Other names: Sanogawa Ichimatsu I

Sanogawa Ichimatsu (佐野川 市松; 1722 – 1762) was an 18th-century kabuki actor.

He was born to a family of samurai in Fushimi in Yamashiro province and was adopted by Jinzô, an usher working at the Minamigawa no Shibai (Minami-za) in Kyôto. Later on, he trained in the Kamigata theaters under Sanogawa Mangiku. He settled in Edo in the 11th lunar month of 1744, where he stayed and won fame as a kabuki actor up to his death in the 11th lunar month of 1762.
