= Shunman =

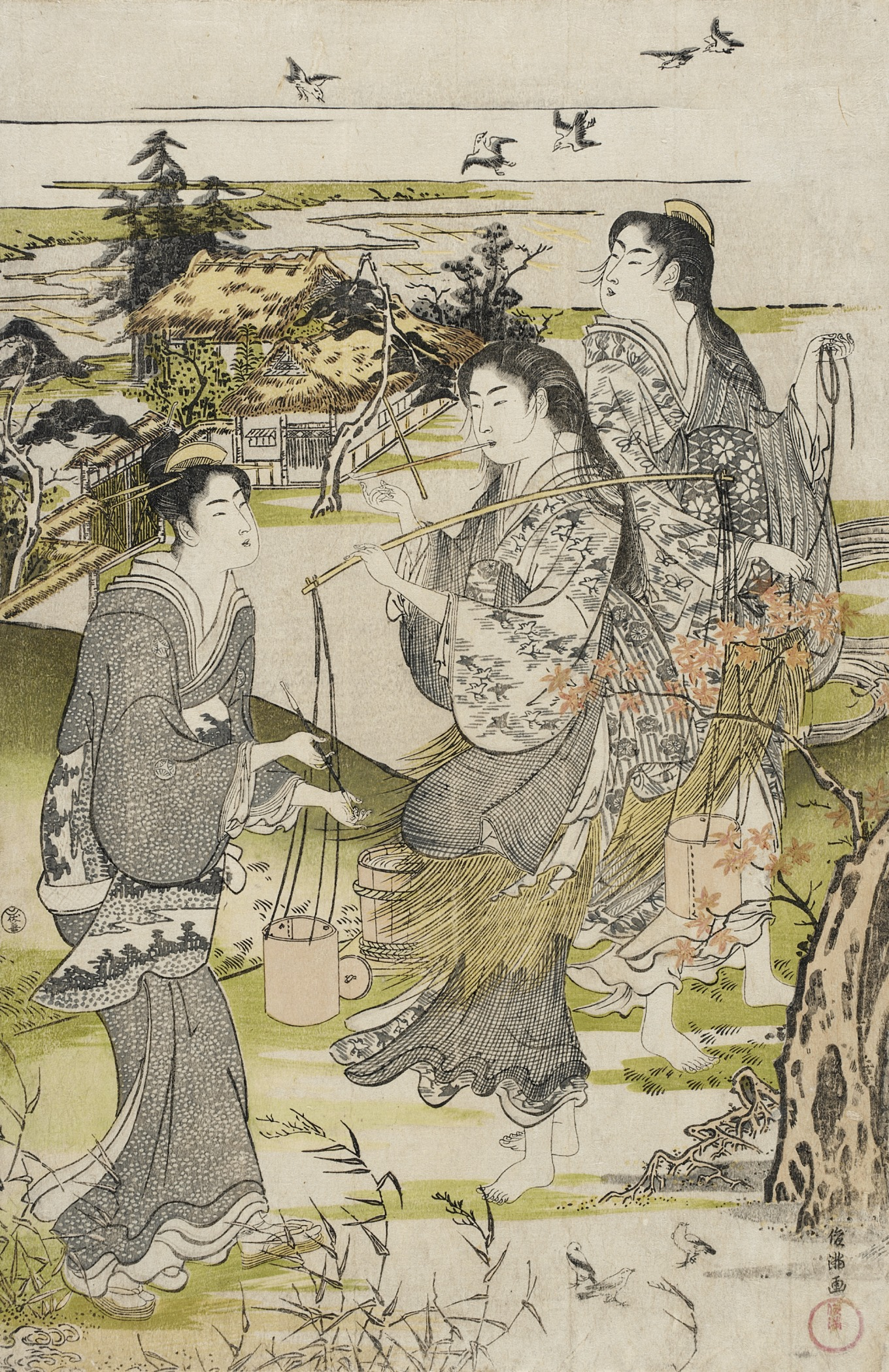
The Tamagawa of Noda, colour woodcut print from the series The Six Tama Rivers, c. 1787

Kubo Shunman (Japanese: 窪 俊満; c. 1757 – 26 October 1820) was a Japanese artist and writer. He produced ukiyo-e prints and paintings, gesaku novels, and kyōka and haiku poetry.

== Life and career ==
Shunman was born in about 1757 (Hōreki 7 on the Japanese calendar) with the surname of either Kubo (窪) or Kubota (窪田) and the given name Yasubei (易兵衛 or 安兵衛). He was orphaned while young. He studied under Katori Nahiko, a poet, kokugaku scholar, and painter in the style of the Chinese Shen Quan. He later also studied under the ukiyo-e artist Kitao Shigemasa.

Upon finishing his apprenticeship took the art name Shunman (first spelt 春満, later 俊満). Other art names he used include Shōsadō (尚左堂) and Sashōdō (左尚堂), both of which use the character 左 sa, meaning "left", as he was left-handed. Early in his career he published as a gesaku novelist under the names Nandaka Shiran (南陀伽 紫蘭) and Kizandō (黄山堂), as a kyōka poet under the name Hitofushi Chitsue (一節 千杖), and as a haiku poet under the name (塩辛房). He had a heightened sense of beauty and devoted himself to the pleasure-seeking world.

Shunman's earliest works dates to 1774: a votive plaque copied from Nahiko. His works include some ukiyoe prints, book illustrations, paintings, illustrated novels, and poetry. He was the most prolific producer of paintings in the Kitao school; more than 70 of his paintings survive.

His best known prints come from the Tenmei (1781–1789) through the Kansei (1789–1801) eras, when Shunman tended toward boldly florid colours in his prints, and adhered to the beni-girai ("red-hating") trend of avoiding reds and other flashy colours. His bijin-ga portraits of beauties were less in the stately style of his master Shigemasa than in that of the long, slender beauties of Torii Kiyonaga. Critics have considered Shunman's prints an improvement on this Kiyonaga model, which he reworked into a personal style with particular attention to evocative atmosphere. Shunman belongs to a group of refined artists, including Kitao Shigemasa and Santō Kyōden, whose pictorial talents have never been fully celebrated, since their main efforts were directed instead toward book illustration and literature.

Shunman was a member of the poets' clubs Bakuro-ren and Rokujuen, and became head of Bakuro-ren. He stopped making designing commercial prints in 1790 to focus on deluxe commissioned prints, and provided poetry for the prints of Hokusai, Utamaro, and Eishi.

Prints by Shunman

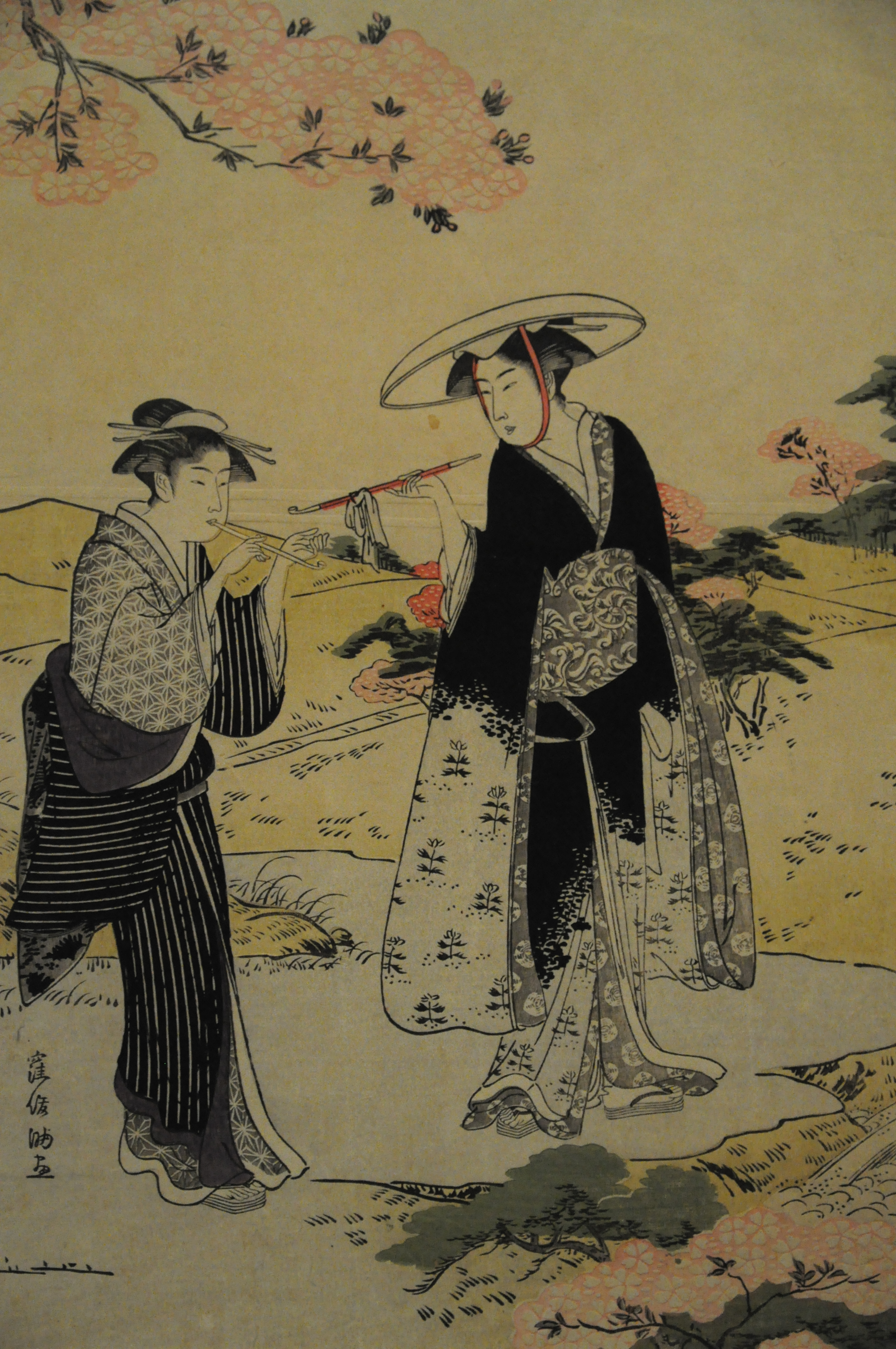

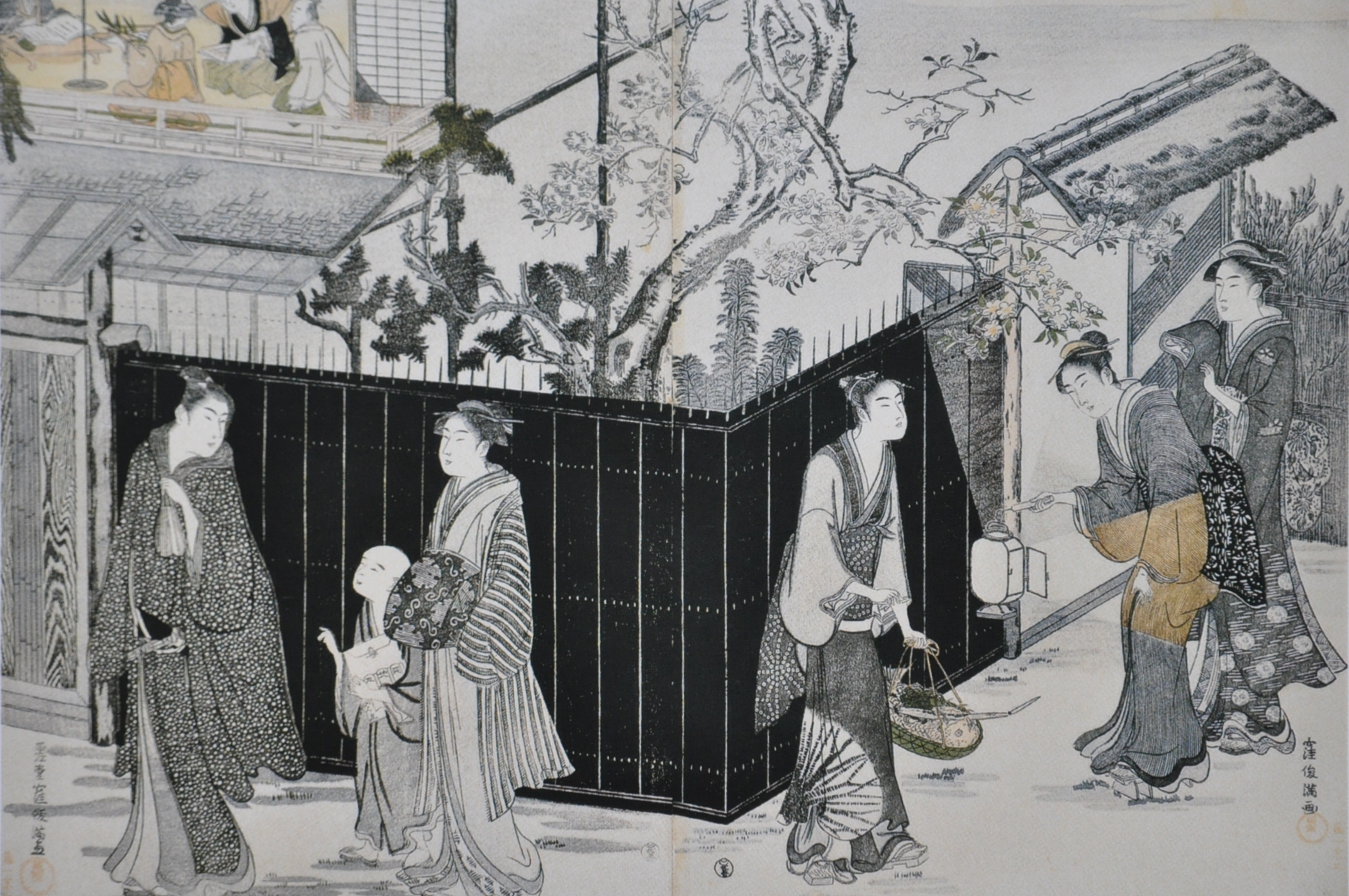

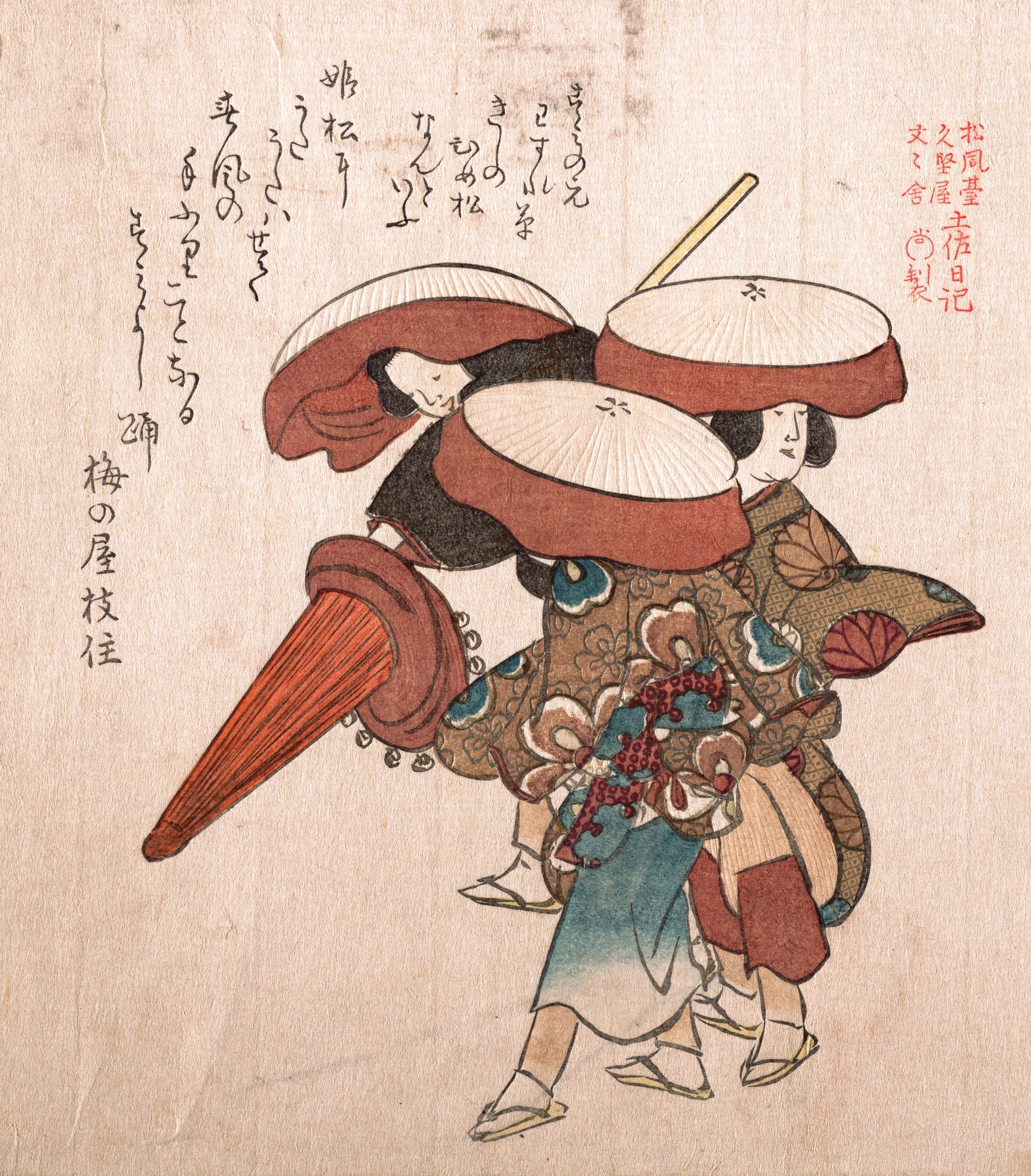

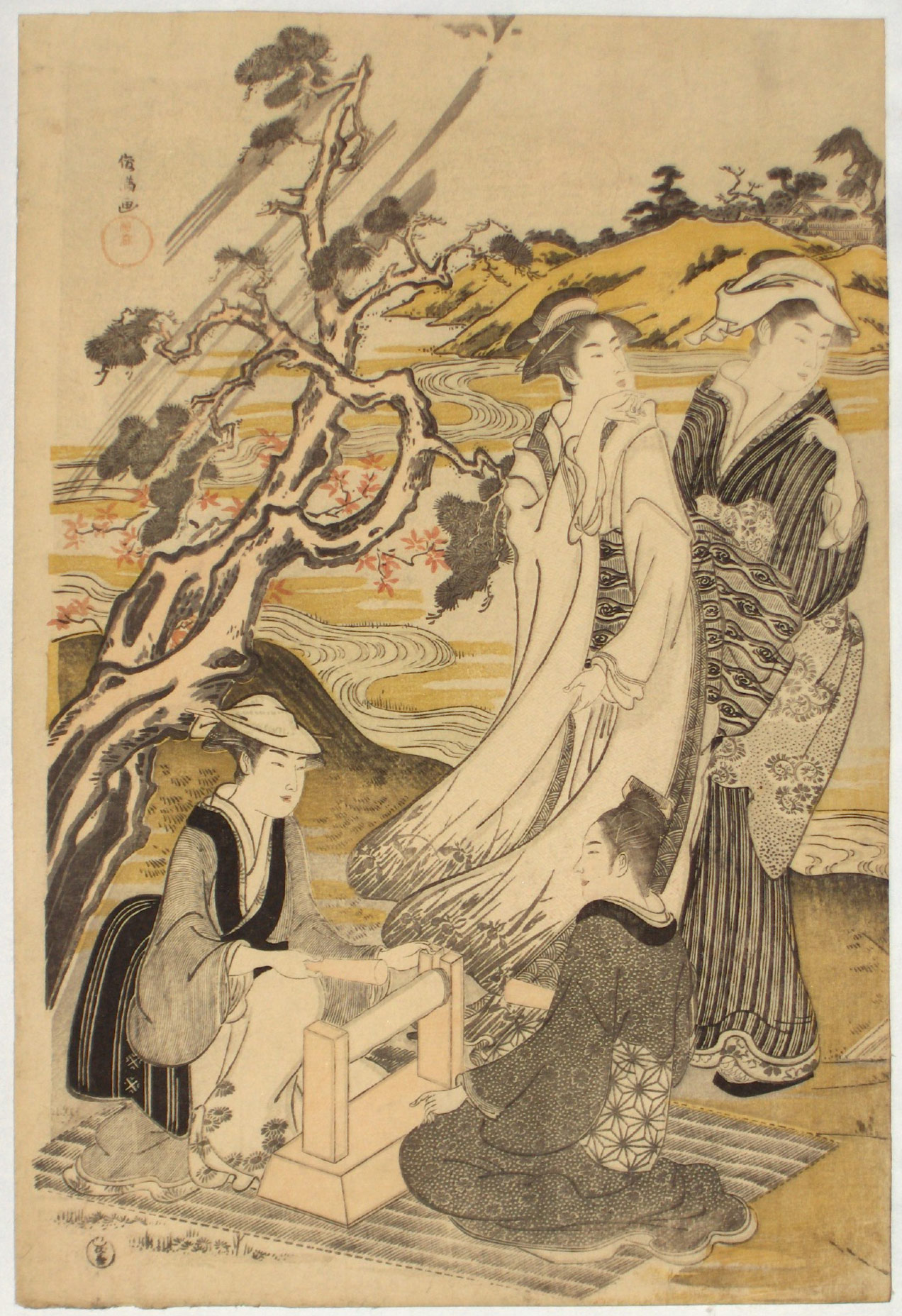

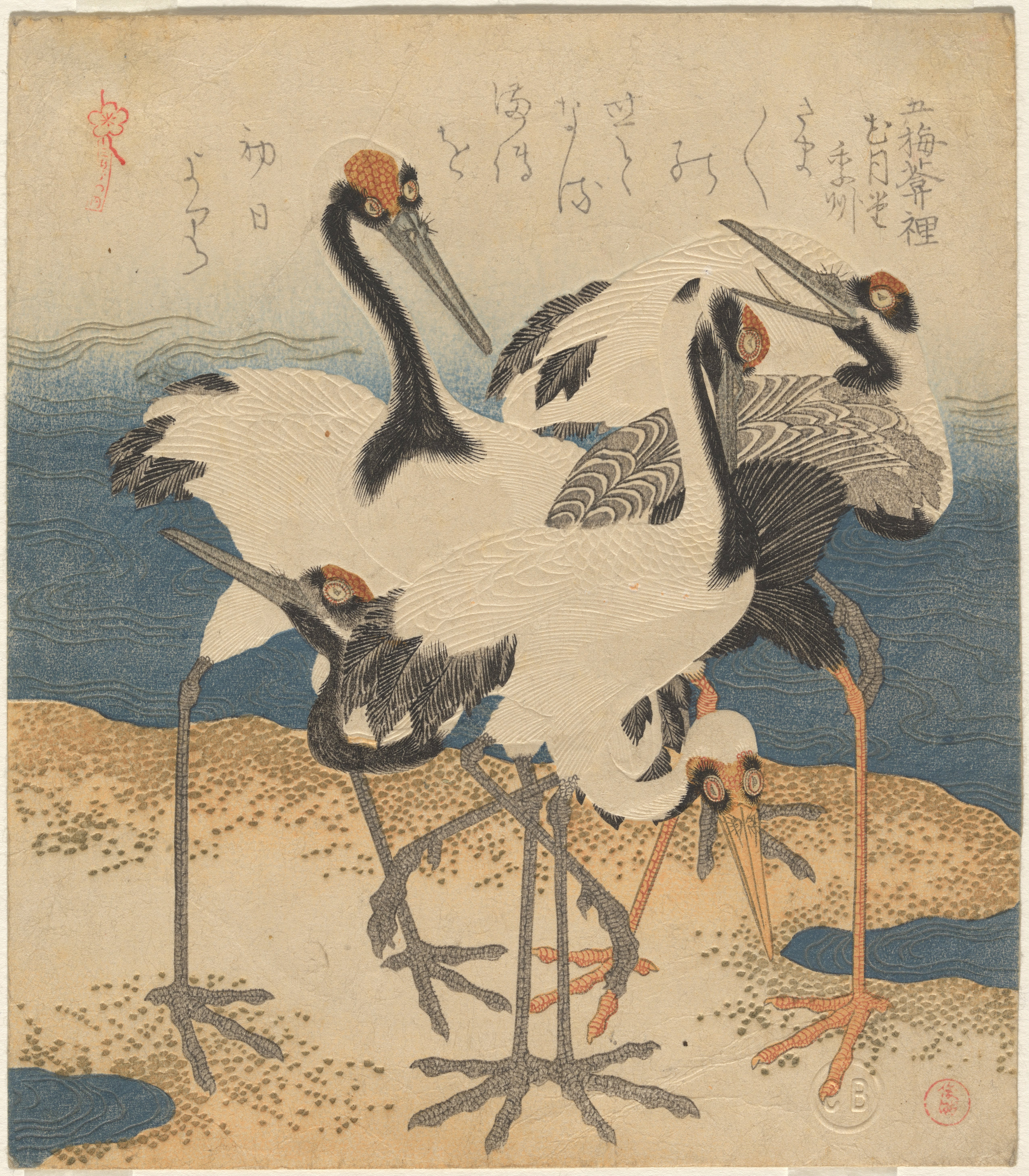
Five cranes on a spit of sand. Surimono, probably 1816. Chester Beatty Library

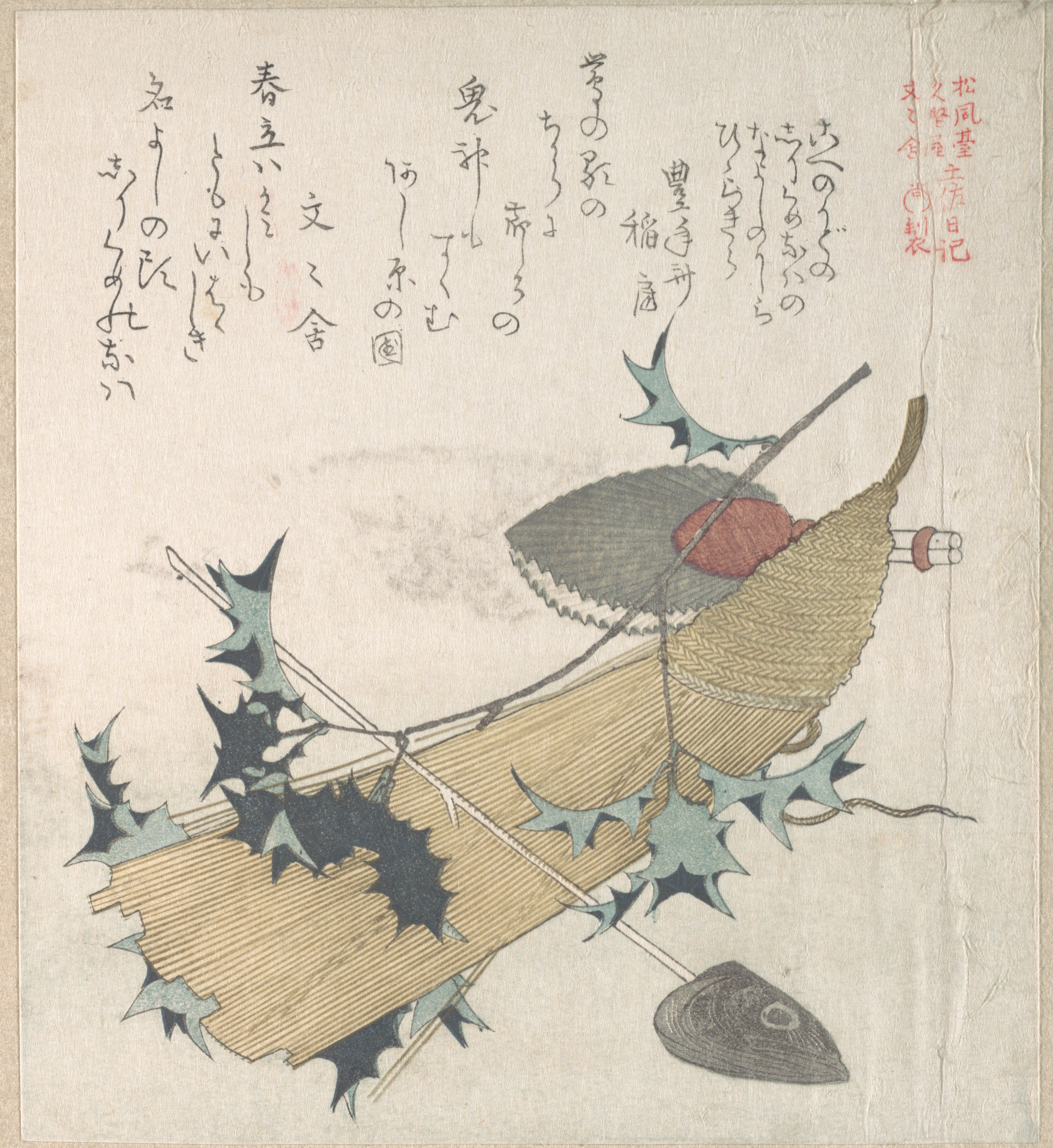
Objects Representing the Ceremony of Exorcising Demons, One of the New Year Performances, surimono, 18th century. The Met.
