= Katagiri Ranseki =

Katagiri Ranseki (片桐 桐隠; c. 1758/9 – 1819) was a Japanese painter of the late Edo period. Born in 1758/9, he was the son of Katagiri Sōyū and a native of Edo. He studied painting under the second generation Kanō Eisen and Watanabe Gentai. He died in 1819 at the age of 61. His pen name was Hakuzenbiki.

A handwritten letter by Katagiri Ranseki.

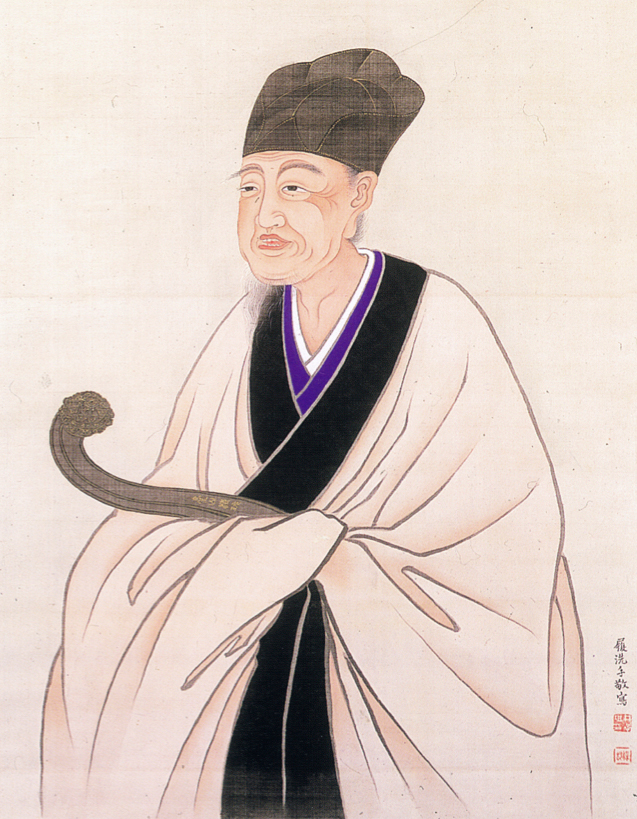
臺山肖像, by Katagiri Ranseki.
