= Eishi =

Japanese ukiyo-e artist

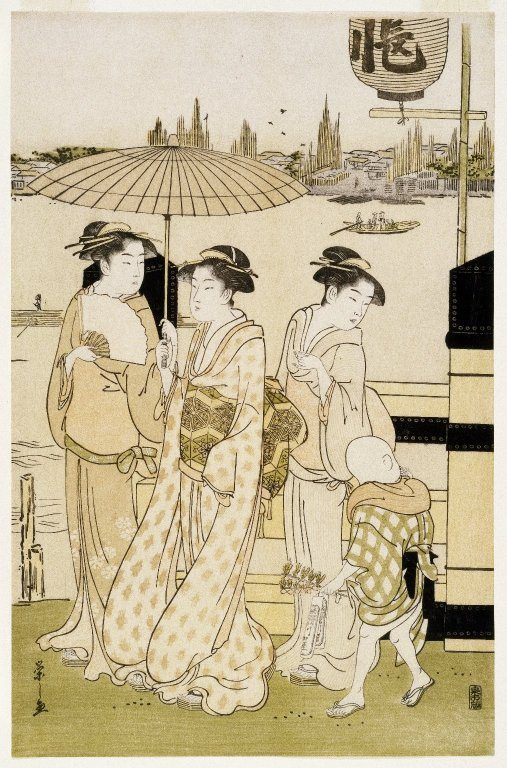
Three Women and a Boy Along the Sumida River, colour woodblock print, c. 1785–1792

Chōbunsai Eishi (鳥文斎 栄之; 1756–1829) was a Japanese ukiyo-e artist. His last name was Hosoda (細田). His first name was Tokitomi (時富). His common name was Taminosuke (民之丞) and later Yasaburo (弥三郎). Pupil of Kano Eisen'in Michinobu (狩野 栄川院 典信). Born as the first son of direct vassal of the Shogunate, a well-off samurai family that was part of the Fujiwara clan. Eishi was a vassal of the Shogunate with a generous stipend of 500 'koku' (90,000 litres) of rice. Eishi left his employ with the Shōgun Ieharu to pursue art. His early works were prints, mostly Bijin-ga portraits of tall, thin, graceful beauties in the original style established by himself akin to Kiyonaga and Utamaro. He established his own school and was a rival to Utamaro. He was a prolific painter, and from 1801 gave up print designing to devote himself to painting.

== Life and career ==
Eishi was born Hosoda Tokitomi (細田 時富) in 1756 to a well-provided samurai family (Note: Eishi's family lived off the considerable stipend of 500 koku of rice per year.) that was part of the prestigious Fujiwara clan. His grandfather Hosoda Tokitoshi (細田 時敏) had held an influential position in the shogunate as Treasury Minister. In 1772 he came to head his family when his father Hosoda Tokiyuki (細田 時行) died. From 1781 he held a position in the palace of the shōgun, Tokugawa Ieharu.

How Eishi took to art is unknown. He appears to have studied under Kanō Michinobu of the Kanō school of painting, from whom he likely was given the art name Eishi—though tradition holds he received the name from Shōgun Ieharu. Michinobu was himself so prolific a painter that he was considered the last member of a great house who had to work tirelessly, and his work was often judged the finest since that of Kanō Tan'yū; besides Michinobu, he also used the art names Eisen, Eisen'in and Hakugyokusai. About 1784 he left the official service of the Shōgun and began to train under Torii Bunryūsai, an ukiyo-e artist about whom almost nothing is known. Eishi's earliest known work dates to the following year. He remained unofficially in the Shōgun's service until 1789, and thereafter left his family in the hands of his adopted son Tokitoyo (時豊), thereby giving up his samurai rank; he reasoned that his ill health did not permit him to continue with such duties.

Eishi's earliest works were colour nishiki-e prints. The subjects are such literary fare as The Tale of Genji and are in subdued tones, as required by contemporary laws against ostentation. He went on to specialize in bijin-ga portraits of beautiful women, of which he produced a number of series. His most prominent rival at first was Kiyonaga; later his work competed against that of Utamaro. His manner of depicting women went through stages: the earliest were of courtesans much in the manner of Kiyonaga; then seated women performing daily activities such as reading or writing, set against bright backgrounds; later, slender women standing against minimal, subdued backgrounds. Eishi depicted gradually taller and more slender women until, in the latest prints, their heads were one-twelfth the height of the figures; more so even than Kiyonaga, whose reputation is for tall, slender beauties. Eishi made occasional illustrations for books of shunga erotica. He also produced a set of four hanging scrolls measuring 148 by 80 cm, in colour on silk, now held in a private collection. He was a prolific painter of such standing that in 1800 a painting of his entered the collection of the cloistered Empress Go-Sakuramachi and he was granted the honorary title Jibukyō (治部卿). Eishi abandoned print designing for painting after 1801.

He died in the seventh month of 1829 and was buried at Rengeji Temple. His Buddhist posthumous name is Kōsetsuin Denkaishin Eishi Nichizui Koji (広説院殿皆信栄之日随居士). He also used the personal names Min'nojō (民之丞) and Yasaburō (弥三郎). Most of his students are little remembered; the best known are Eiri and Eishō.

Works by Eishi

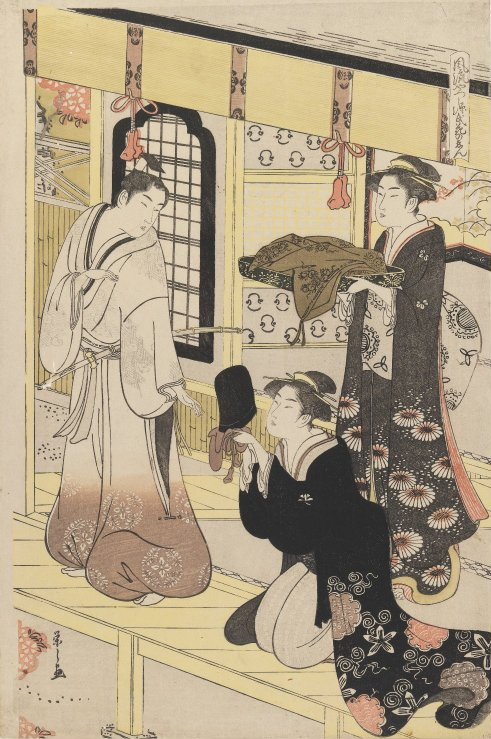
Hana no En, colour woodblock print, c. 1787–1793, from Eight Views of Disguised Genji

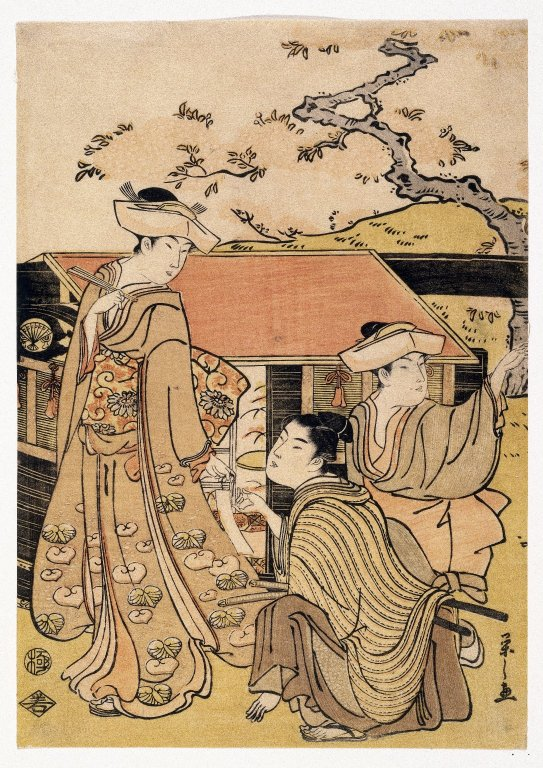
Cherry Blossom Viewing at Gotenyama Hill, colour woodblock print, c. 1791–1797

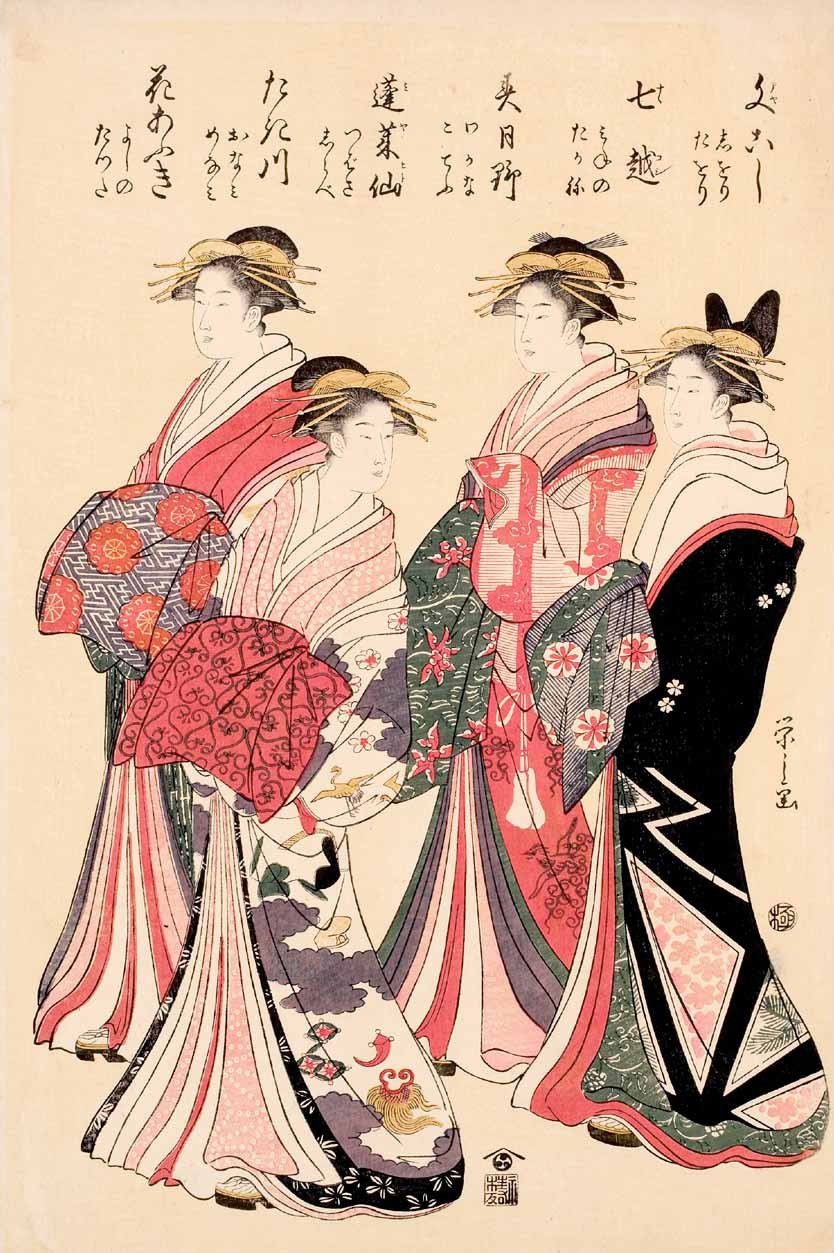
Courtesans of the Ōgiya Brothel, colour woodblock print, c. 1800

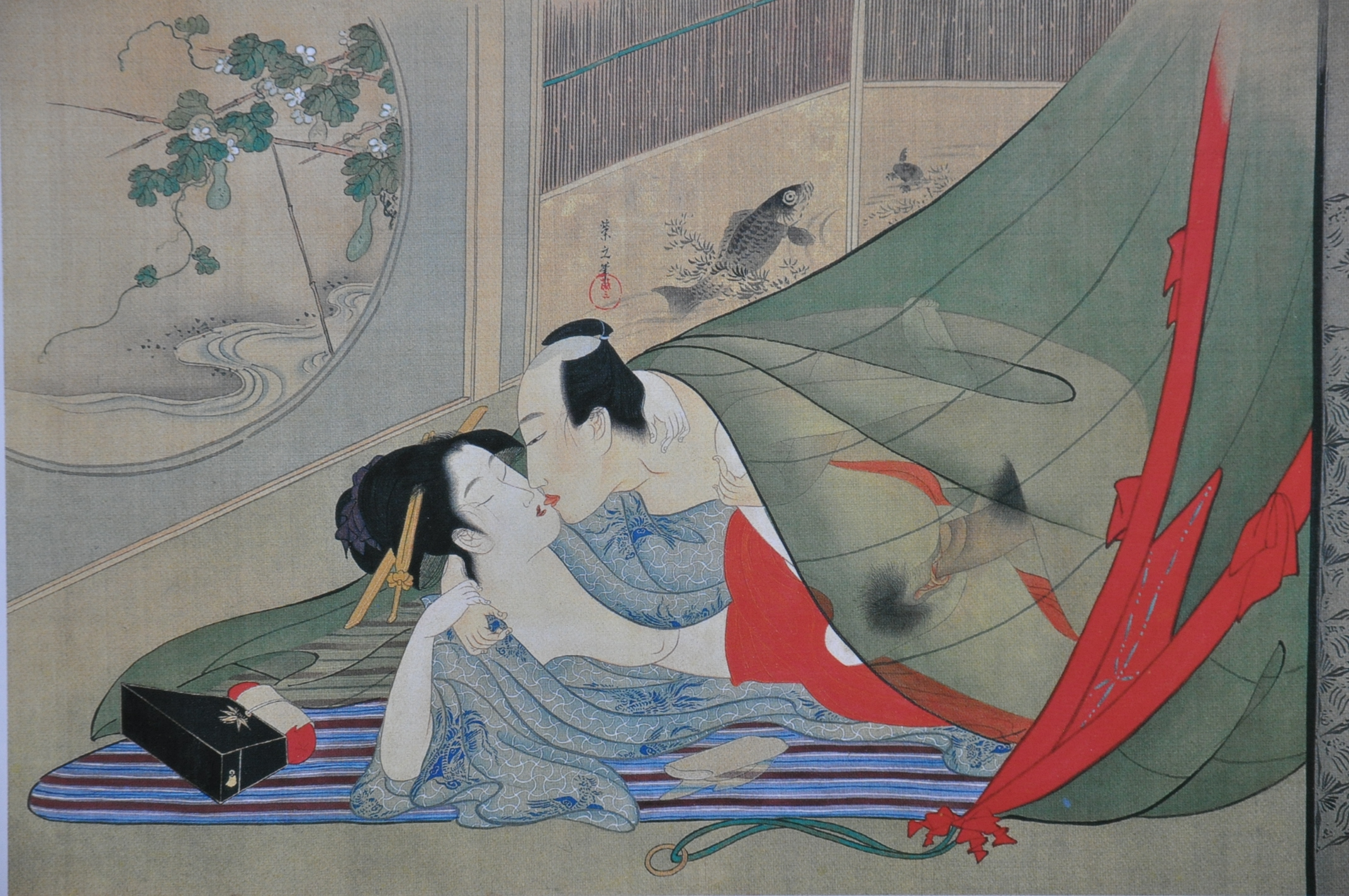
Summer, from the series Pleasure Competition in the Four Seasons, colour on silk, c. 1794–1801

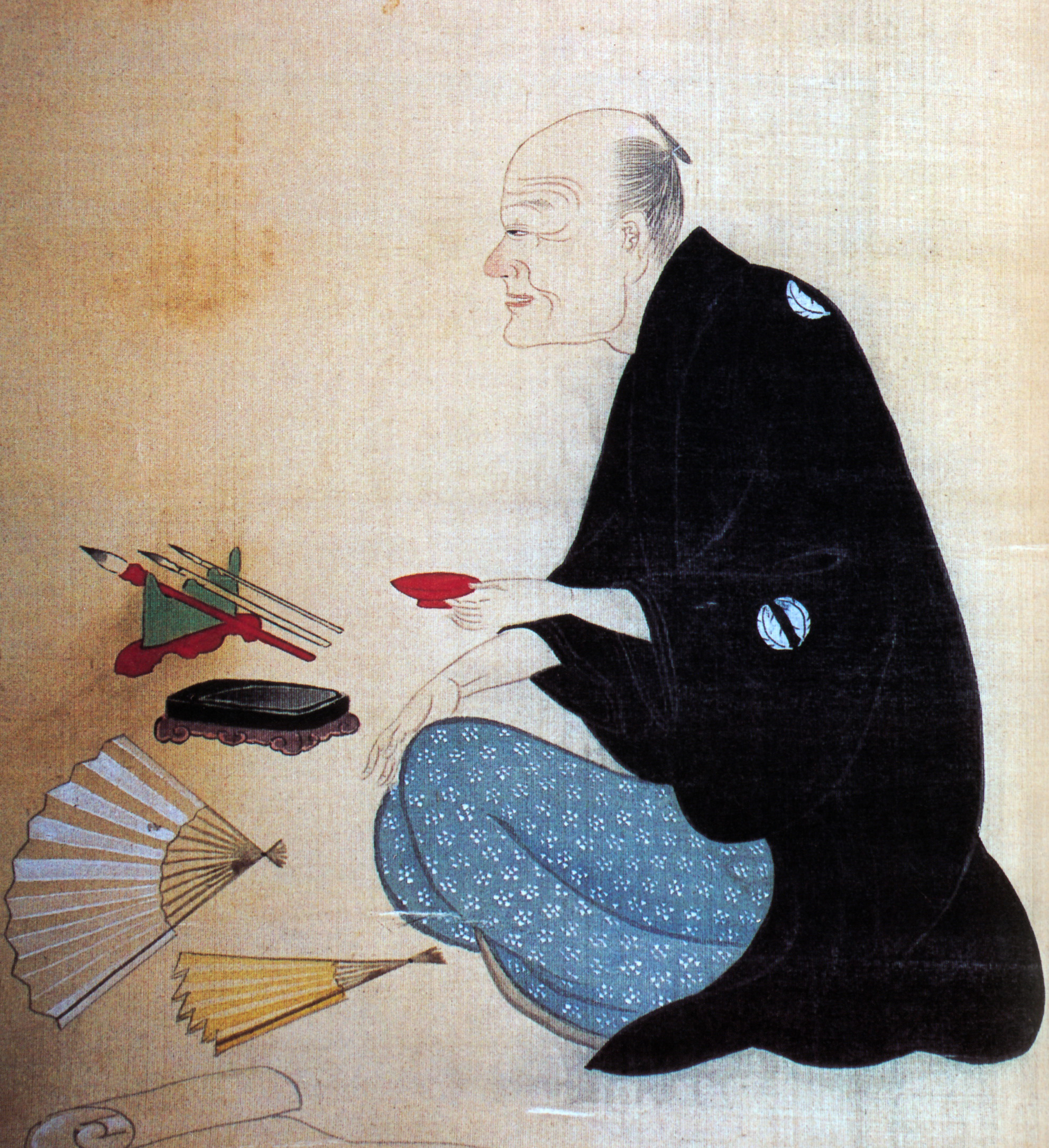
Ōta Nanpo, c. 1814

== Collections ==
Modern Collections that feature Eishi's work:

- Art Gallery of Greater Victoria
- Art Gallery of New South Wales
- Art Institute of Chicago
- Asian Art Museum (San Francisco)
- British Museum
- Cleveland Museum of Art
- Fine Arts Museums of San Francisco
- Finnish National Gallery
- Harvard Art Museums
- Hermitage Museum
- Indianapolis Museum of Art
- Israel Museum, Jerusalem
- Lauren Rogers Museum of Art
- Los Angeles County Museum of Art
- Metropolitan Museum of Art
- Minneapolis Institute of Art
- Museum of Fine Arts, Boston
- Nelson-Atkins Museum of Art
- the Newark Museum of Art
- Norton Simon Museum
- Philadelphia Museum of Art
- San Diego Museum of Art
- San Francisco Museum of Modern Art
- Suntory Museum of Art
- Tikotin Museum of Japanese Art
- University of Michigan Museum of Art
- Victoria and Albert Museum
- Weatherspoon Art Museum
