= Chōkōsai Eishō =

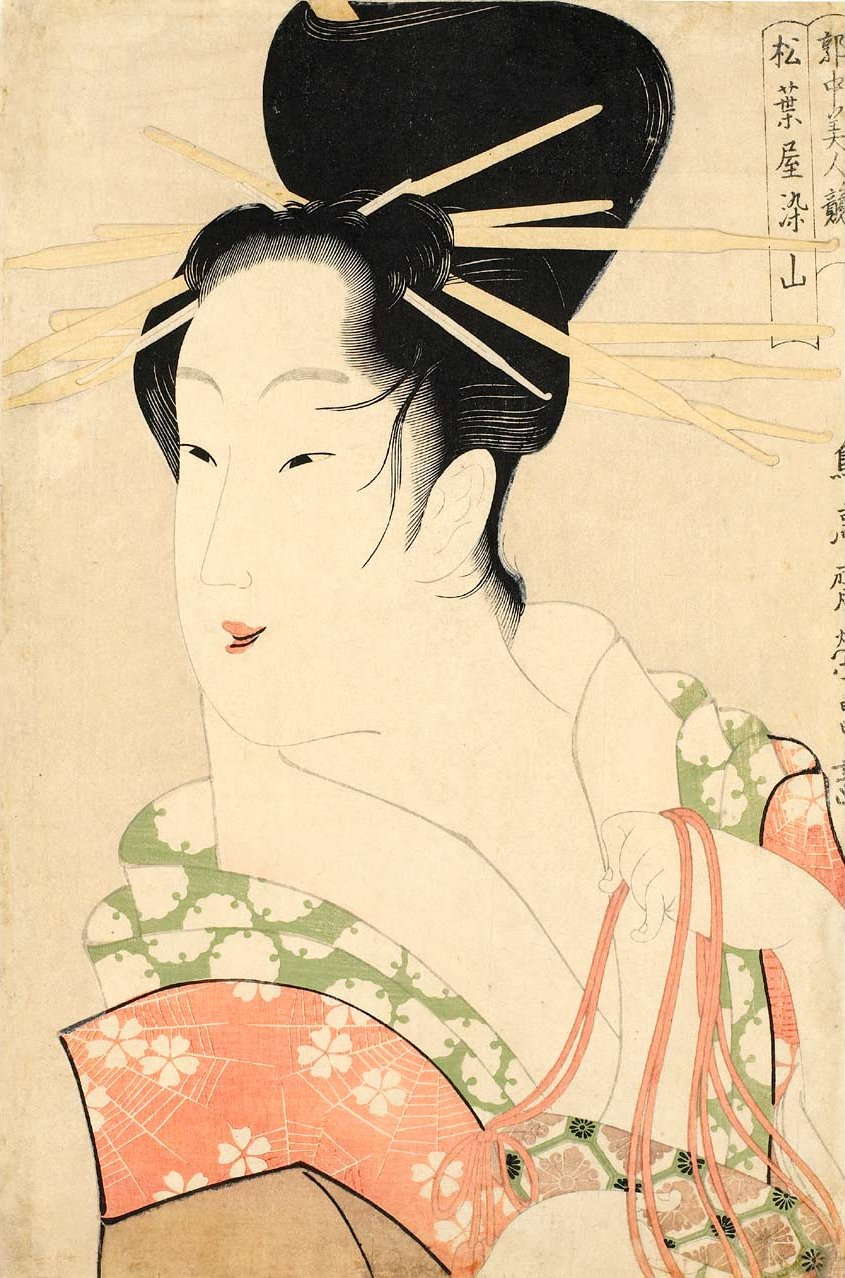
The Courtesan Someyama of the Matsubaya Brothel, from the series Contest of Beauties in the Pleasure Quarters, c. 1795–1797

Chōkōsai Eishō (鳥高斎 栄昌, fl. 1790s) was a Japanese ukiyo-e artist. He also used the name Shōeidō (昌栄堂).

Eishō's personal details are unknown. His works that remain show a practised skill, so it is likely that they appeared after years of apprenticeship. He is the most prominent student of Eishi and had a prolific output; nearly 200 of his works remain—more than any other student of Eishō's. He produced at least twenty print series published by fourteen publishers, in particular for Yamaguchiya Chūsuke. The majority of his work appeared between c. 1792 and c. 1799.

Eishō's work is assumed to have been in competition with that of Utamaro, who was known for his vertical ōkubi-e bust prints in the bijin-ga genre of portraits of beautiful women. Most of Eishō's prints were in the same format. He depicted his subjects in an elegant, slender-proportioned style. His most representative prints are considered to be those from the series Kakuchū bijin kurabe (郭中美人競, "Contest of beauties in the pleasure quarters", c. 1795–1797). The series depicts actual courtesans from the Yoshiwara pleasure quarters, and the backgrounds were treated with glimmering mica. Eishō contributed twenty of the twenty-four print designs; the remainder were by fellow Eishi students Eiri and Eiu.

Eishō produced illustrations for a few books in c. 1798–1801, some of which were shunga erotica. Prints by him ceased appearing around 1801, the same year Eishi gave up print designing for nikuhitsu-ga painting. Eishō produced few paintings, and his reasons for giving up printmaking are unknown. A painting that remains is a handscroll of Eishi as an old man, made perhaps in the 1810s or 1820s.

Works by Chōkōsai Eishō

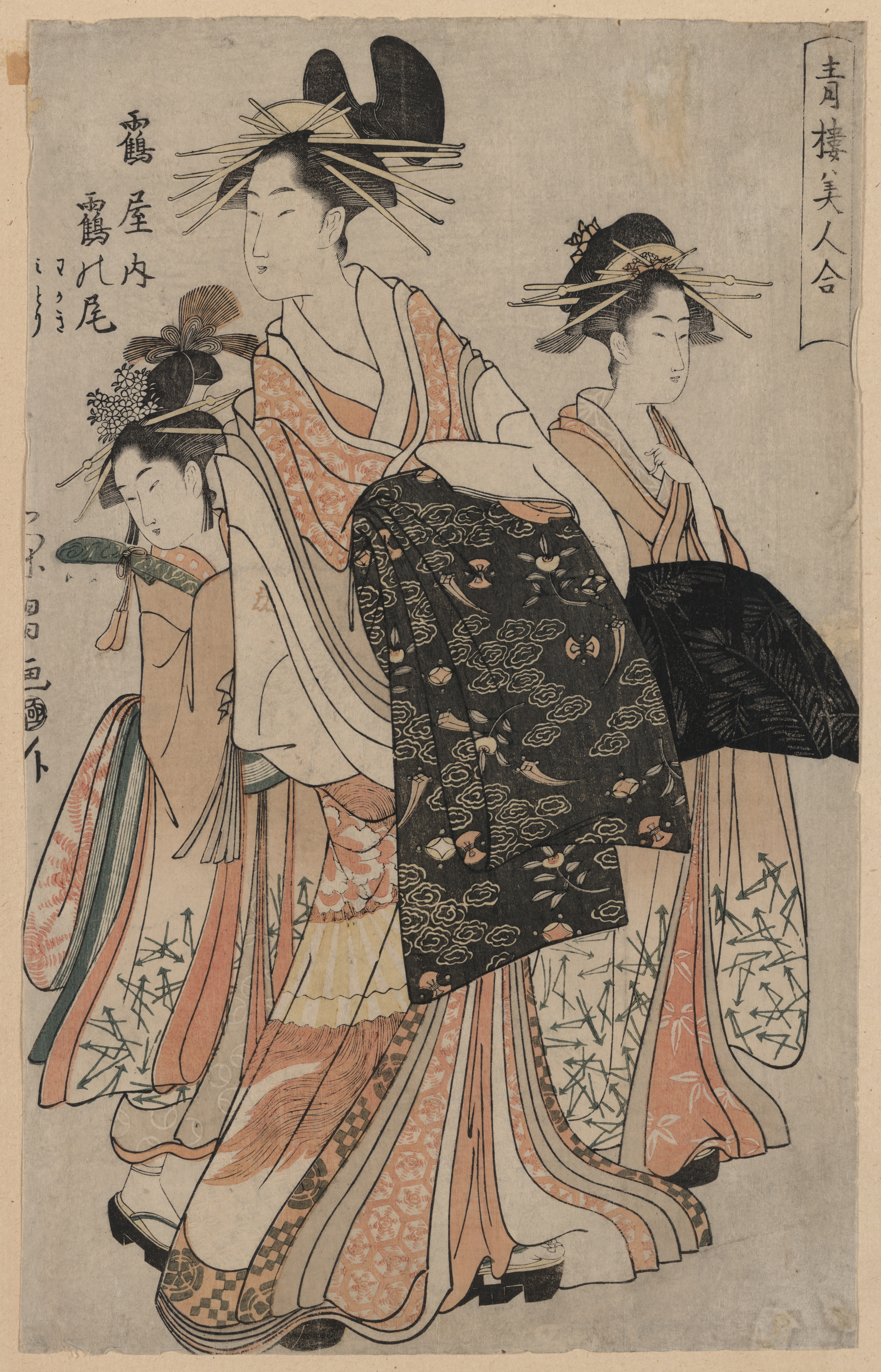

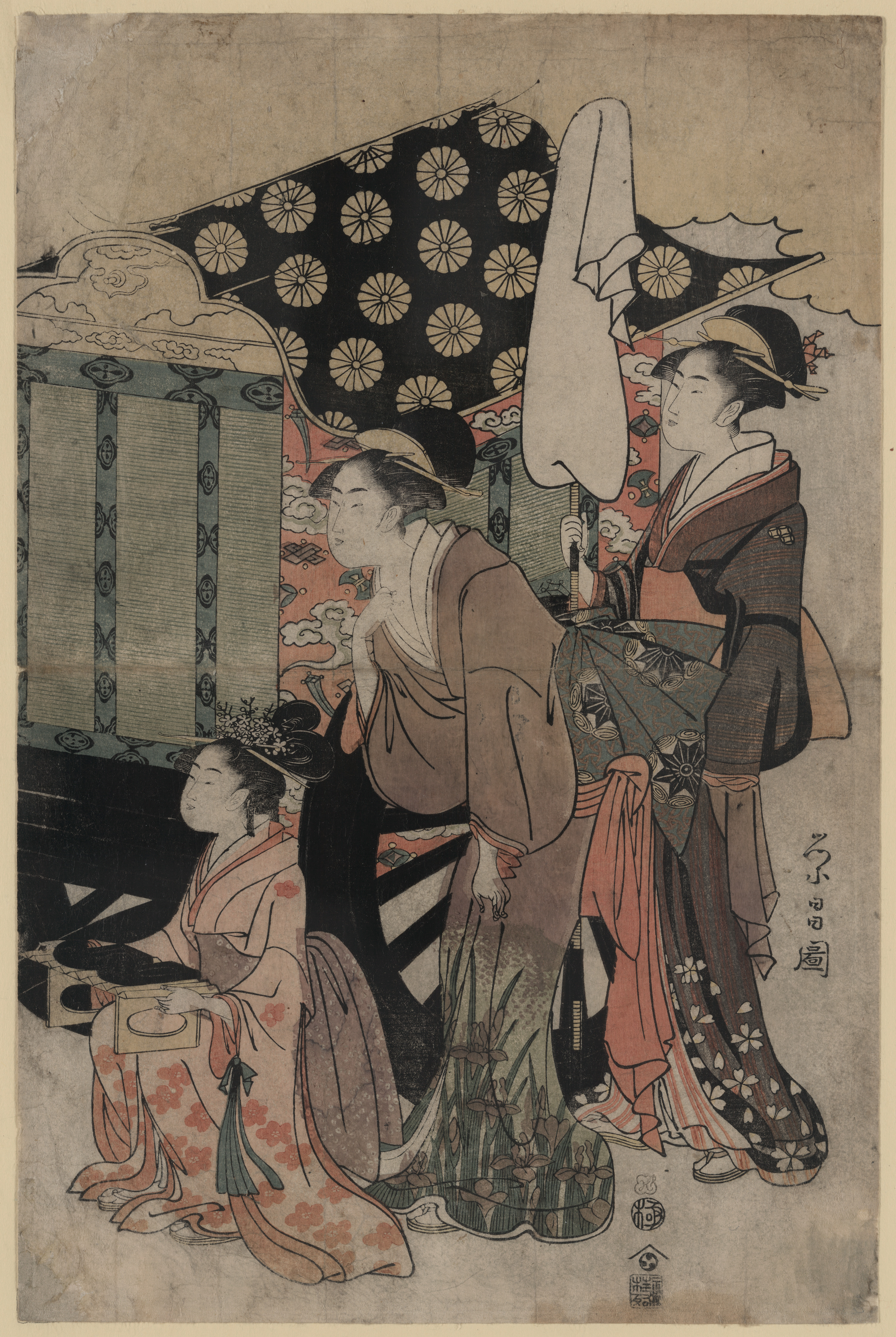

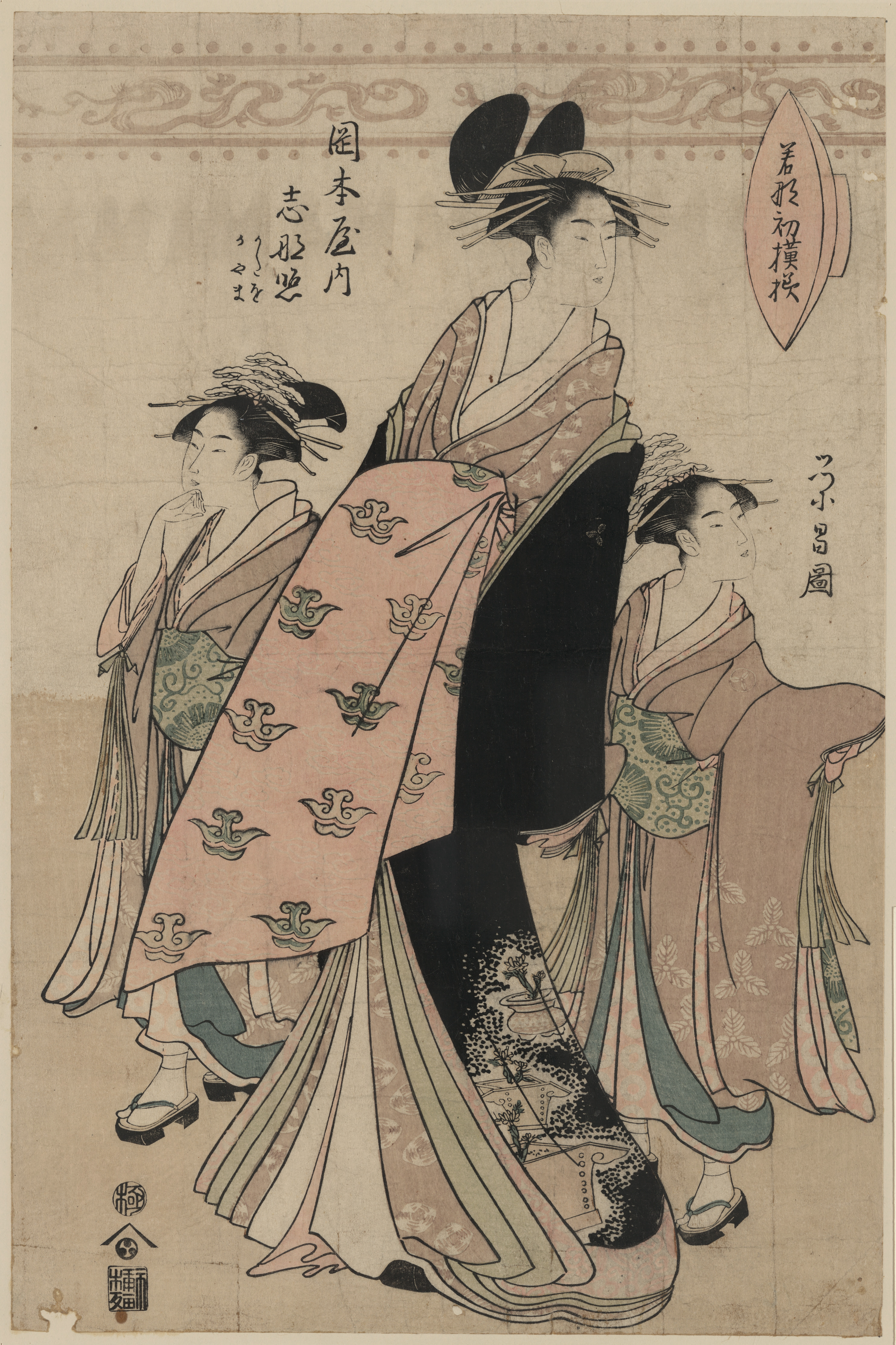

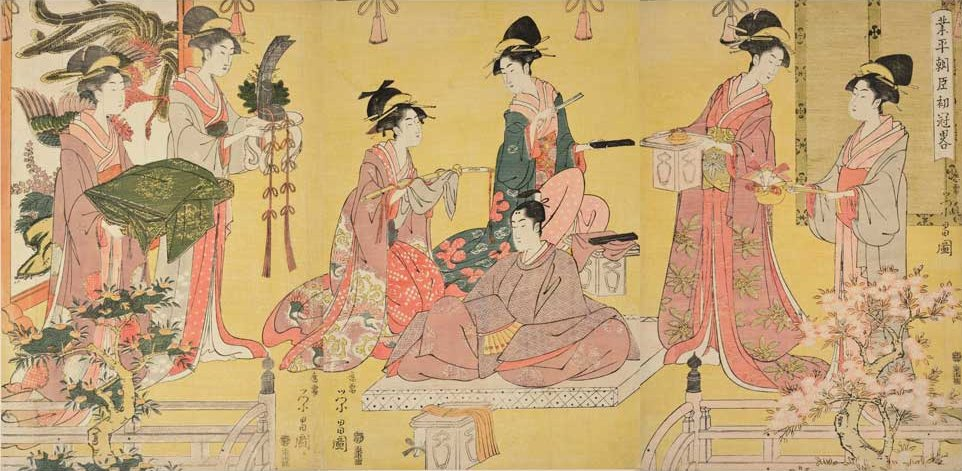
