= Katagiri Sōyū =

Katagiri Sōyū (片桐 宗幽; ? – 2 March, 1801) was a Japanese tea master of the late Edo period. He studied in Sekishu-ryu school of tea under Shinoda Shorei and served as a teacher to Yanagisawa Yasumitsu. His common name was Tatewaki, but he was also known by his pen names Yuko and Ippōan. He was the father of Katagiri Ranseki.
