= Kitao Shigemasa =

Japanese ukiyo-e artist (1739–1820)

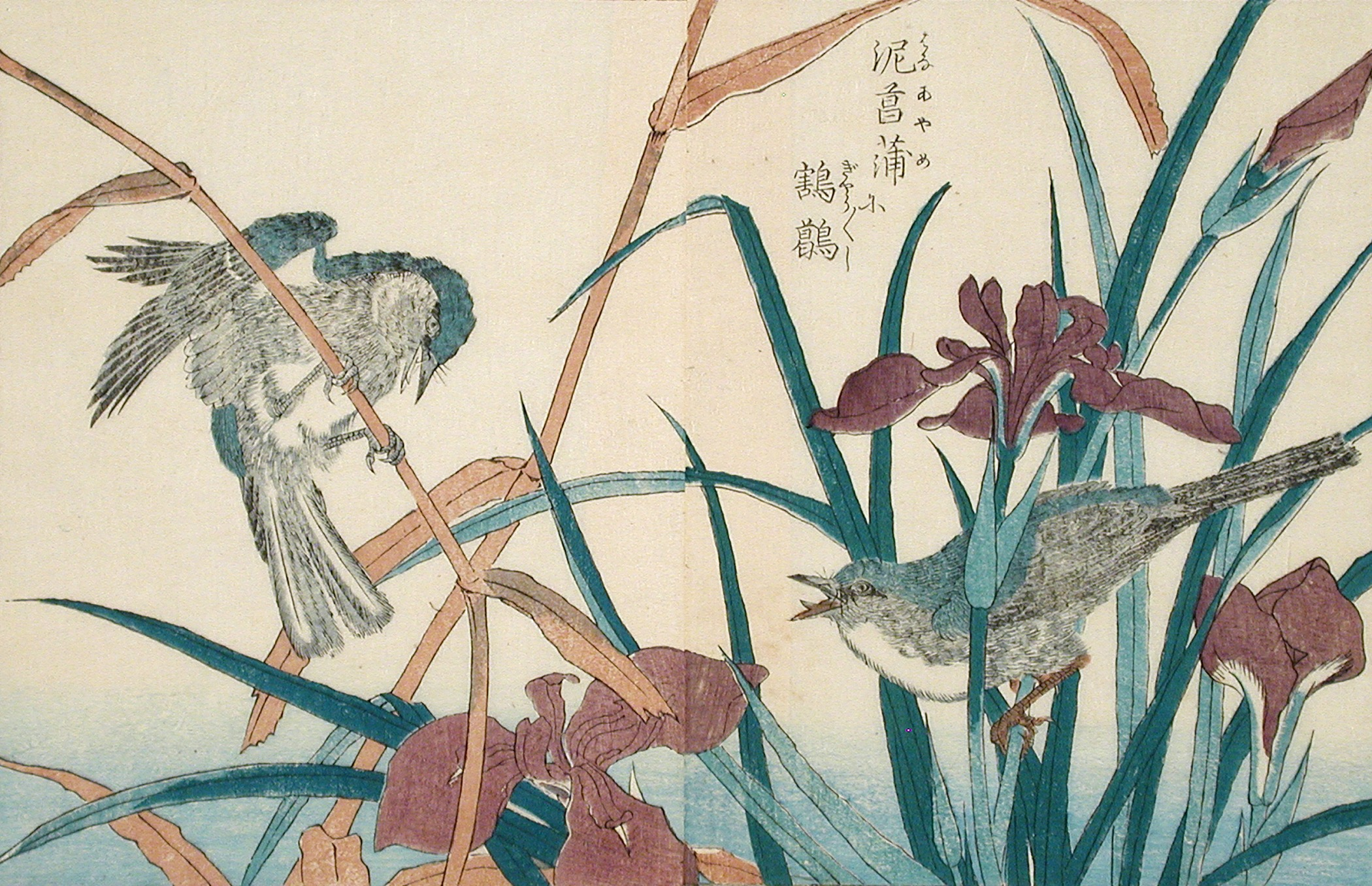
Birds and Iris

Kitao Shigemasa (北尾 重政; 1739 – 8 March 1820) was a Japanese ukiyo-e artist from Edo. He was one of the leading printmakers of his day, but his works have been slightly obscure. He is noted for images of beautiful women (bijinga). He was taught by Shigenaga and has been referred to as "a chameleon" who adapted to changing styles. He was less active after the rise of Torii Kiyonaga and produced relatively few works considering the length of his career. He is also noted for his haikai (poetry) and shodō (Japanese calligraphy). In his later years he used the studio name Kosuisai.

== Life and career ==
Shigemasa was born the eldest son of bookseller Suharaya Mohei in 1739 in Nihonbashi area Edo (modern Tokyo). His family name was Kitabatake and his childhood name was Tarōkichi. Throughout his life he also used the personal names Kyūgorō and Sasuke. His work also appeared under the art names Hokuhō, Kōsuisai, Kōsuiken, Suihō Itsujin, and others, and he used the poetry name Karan.

Shigemasa taught himself art before becoming a student of Nishimura Shigenaga. His early works are bijin-ga images of beautiful women in the style of Suzuki Harunobu. From 1765 he began illustrating books, which became his main focus; over 250 are known. His work was published by more than twenty publishers, including Tsutaya Jūzaburō.

A number of Shigemasa's better-known works were collaborations with Katsukawa Shunshō: the print series Silkworm Cultivation (Kaiko yashinai gusa) beginning about 1772 and the illustrated book Mirror of Competing Beauties of the Green Houses (Seirō bijin awase sugata kagami) from about 1776.

Shigemasa founded the Kitao lineage of artists. Amongst his students were Kubo Shunman and Santō Kyōden. His other students included Kitao Shigemasa II (also known as Kitagawa Yoshimaru), who together with Kuninao illustrated Shikitei Sanba's kokkeibon novel Ukiyo-buro (1809–1813), as well as Kitao Masanobu and Kitao Masayoshi. According to some historians, Shigemasa was also, albeit unofficially, a teacher of Kitagawa Utamaro and Katsushika Hokusai. Shigemasa died in his 82nd year on the 24th day of the first month of 1820.

== Gallery ==
Works by Kitao Shigemasa

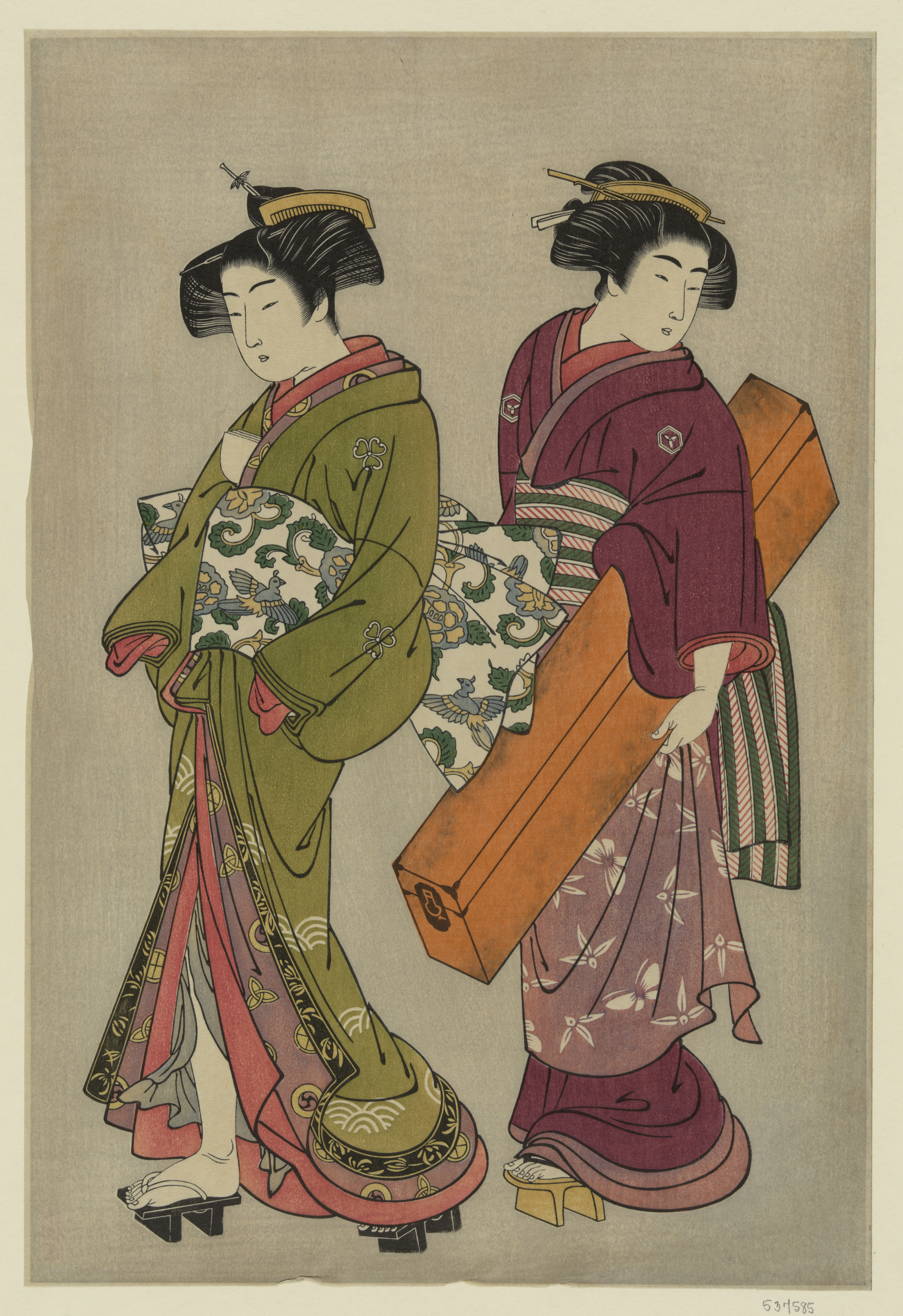

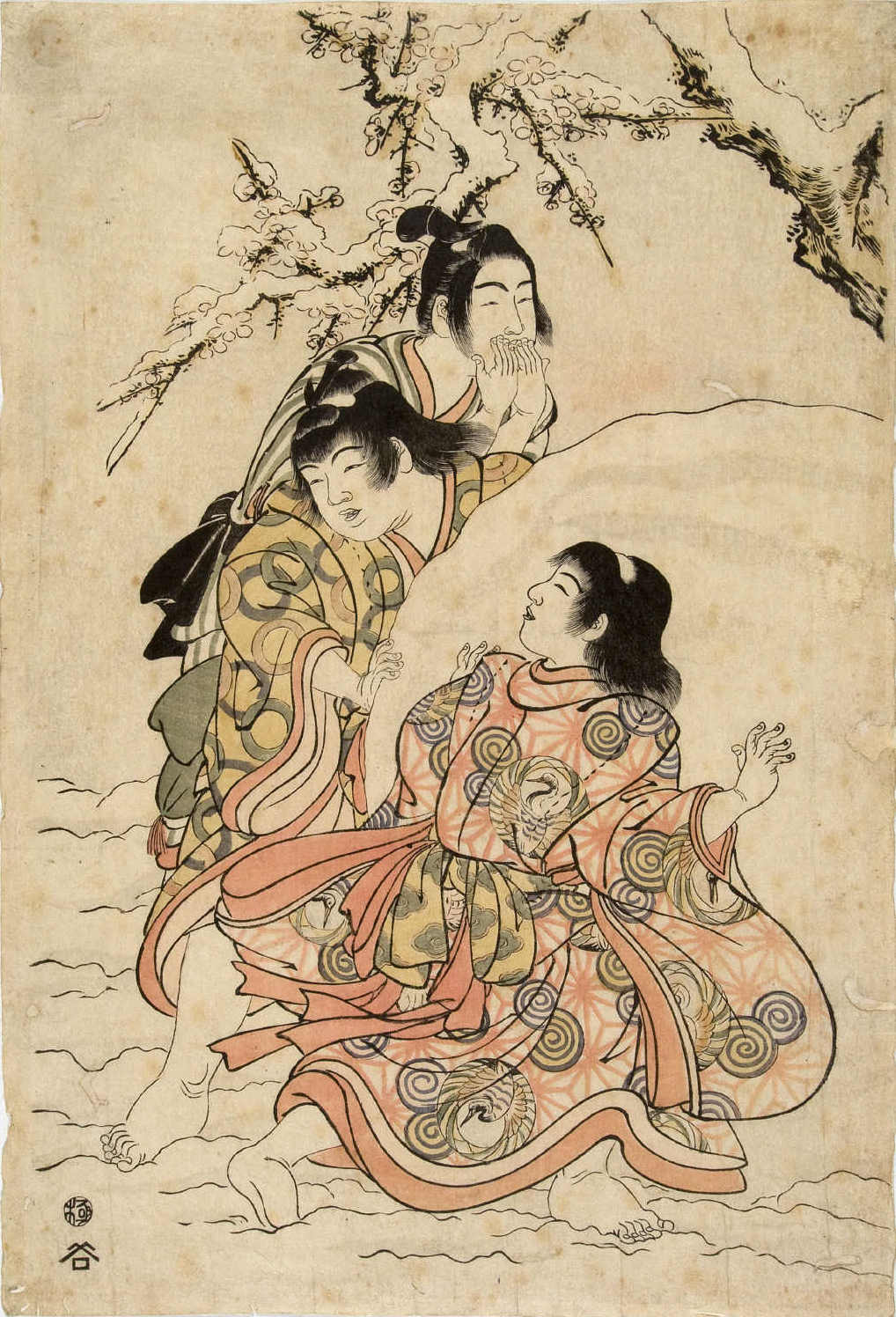

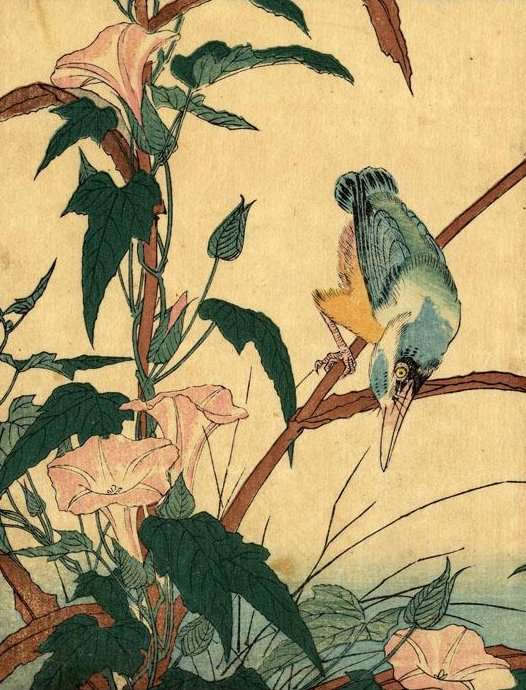

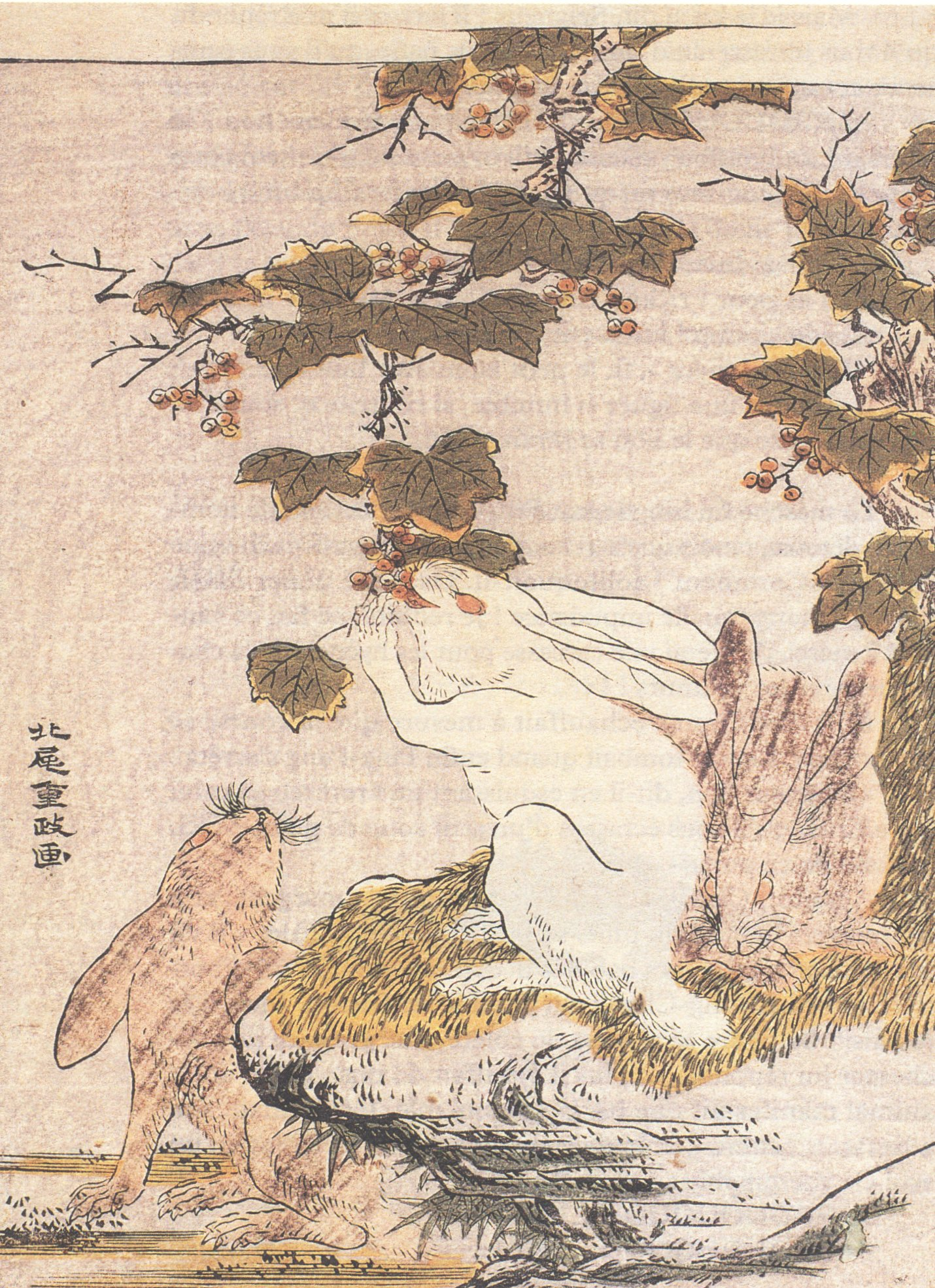
Rabbits eating grapes
