= Kanō Michinobu =

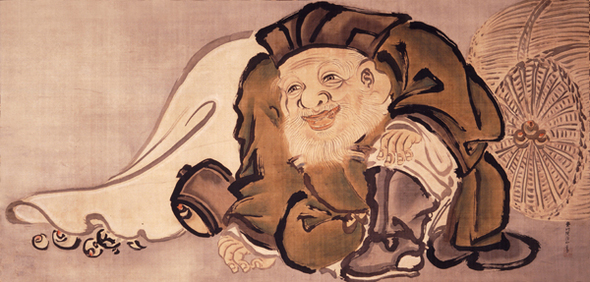
Daikoku-zu, 18th century, pigment on silk, 96 × 197 centimetres (38 × 78 in)

Kanō Michinobu (狩野 典信, 20 December 1730 – 24 September 1790) was a Japanese painter of the Kanō school of painting. He was the first appointed "inner painter" to the shōgun, to whom he remained close. Michinobu also used the art names Eisen (英川), Eisen'in (英川院), and Hakugyokusai (白玉斎).

== Life and career ==
Michinobu was born with the given name Shōzaburō (庄三郎) on the 11th day of the 11th month of the year Kyōhō (20 December 1730) in Edo (modern Tokyo). He was the first son of the Kanō school painter Eisen Hisanobu (英川古信, or Kanō Furonobu 1698–1731), who had taken over as head of the school from Kanō Tsunenobu in 1728 and who died in 1731, the year after Michinobu's birth. Jusen Harunobu (受川玄信) was adopted into the family to carry on the line but also fell sick and died in 1731 at age 17. Michinobu was thus officially named to carry on the line. As he was an infant, he did not have an audience with the shōgun whom he was to serve until 1741.

Michinobu was prolific and ambitious and came to dominate the Kanō school. In the face of the rising popularity of popular art of the Nanpin school, Michinobu strove to revive the Kanō school's fading status and re-introduced the bold brush strokes of the school's Chinese-inspired roots.

He won the deep favour of the shōgun Tokugawa Ieharu (1737–86), to whom he remained close and who had Michinobu moved from his workshop in Takegawa to a mansion in Kobikichō in central Edo. The branch flourished and Michinobu instructed large numbers of students. Under Ieharu's influence the Kobikichō branch replaced the Nakabishi branch as the dominant branch of the Kanō school.

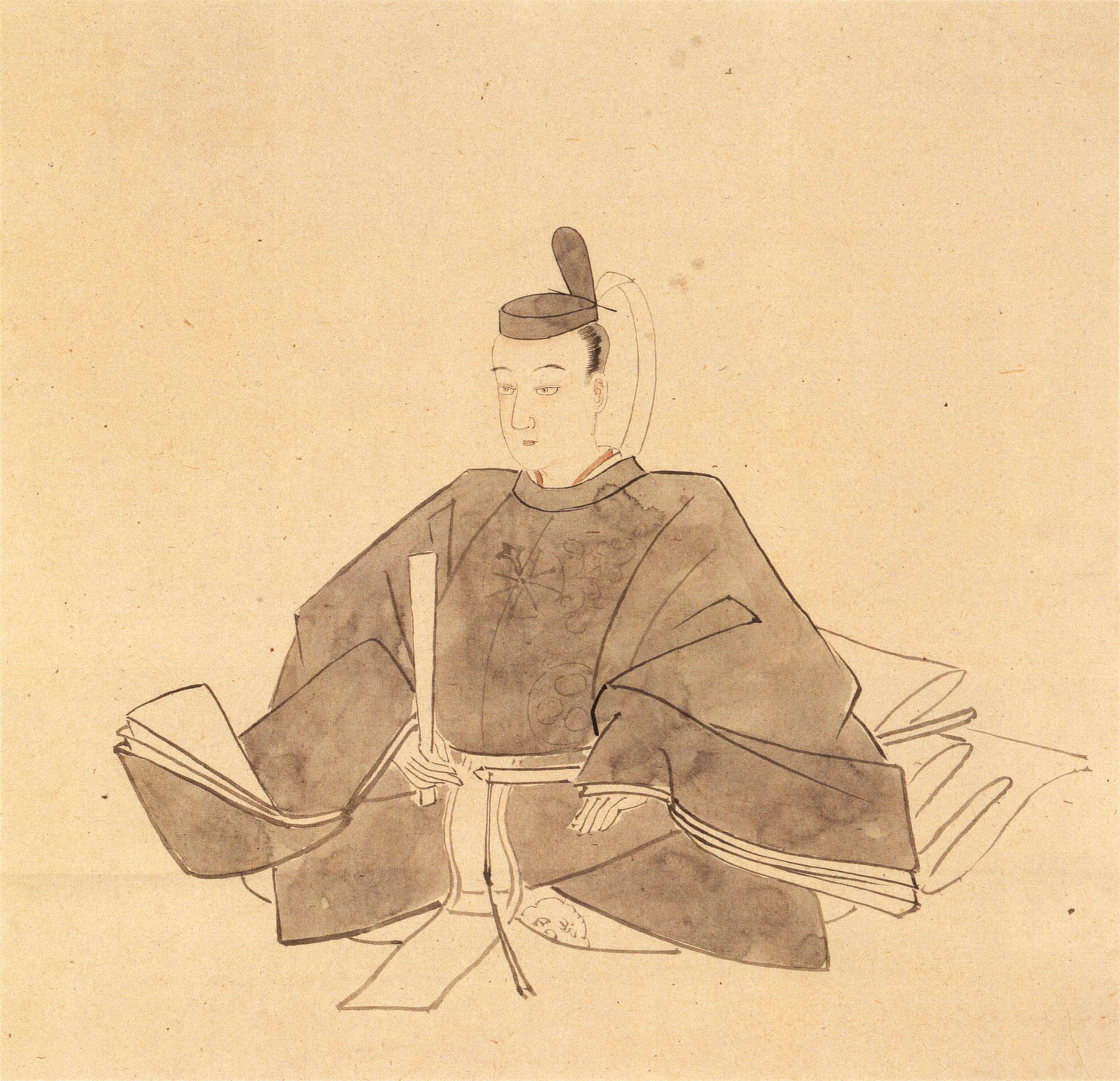
Portrait of Tokugawa Iemoto, 18th century, ink and light colour on paper, 65.8 x 55.0 cm

In 1762 the rank of hōgen—the second highest for Buddhist priests—was conferred on Michinobu. In 1763 he was made an "inner painter" (奥御用絵師 oku-goyō eshi), a title Ieharu had created that year for painters appointed to paint the shōgun's inner chambers and which gave the painter freedom to roam these chambers and personal access to the shōgun.

Michinobu lost influence after the death of Ieharu in 1786; the next shōgun Ienari's senior councilor Matsudaira Sadanobu described him as "an adept painter and remarkably proficient at securing the patronage of important persons" and favoured other outside painters.

On Michinobu's death in 1790 his son Korenobu (1753–1808) succeeded as the head of the Kanō school.

== Legacy ==
Almost every major collection of Japanese art in the world has an example of Michinobu's prolific work. The Tokugawa Chronicle declares him "the last member of a great house" who had "to labour without stint". His work was highly praised and was often judged the greatest since Kanō Tan'yū's, though writer Ueda Akinari stated he could not "detect much to admire in him". The shogunate retainer Moriyama Takamori considered Michinobu "a good painter" who was "compromised" by his ambitions and self-promotion.

The ukiyo-e artist Chōbunsai Eishi (1756–1829) appears to have studied under Michinobu. Eishi may have received his art name from Michinobu, though tradition holds the shōgun Ieharu bestowed it on him.

== Works cited ==
- Marks, Andreas (2012). Japanese Woodblock Prints: Artists, Publishers and Masterworks: 1680–1900. Tuttle Publishing. ISBN 978-1-4629-0599-7.
- Screech, Timon (2000). Shogun's Painted Culture: Fear and Creativity in the Japanese States, 1760-1829. Reaktion Books. ISBN 978-1-86189-688-9.
- Yamashita, Yūji (2004). Kanō-ha ketteiban 狩野派決定版. Bessatsu Taiyō (in Japanese). Heibonsha. ISBN 978-4-58292131-1. OCLC 64782262.
- Yasumura, Toshinobu (2006). Motto Shiritai Kanō-ha: Tan'yū to Edo Kanō-ha もっと知りたい狩野派: 探幽と江戸狩野派. Tokyo Bijutsu. ISBN 978-4-8087-0815-3.
