= Torii Kiyonaga =

Japanese ukiyo-e artist (1752–1815)

Bathhouse Women

Torii Kiyonaga (Japanese: 鳥居 清長; 1752 – June 28, 1815) was a Japanese ukiyo-e artist of the Torii school. Originally Sekiguchi Shinsuke, the son of an Edo bookseller, from Motozaimokuchō Itchōme in Edo, he took on Torii Kiyonaga as an art name. Although not biologically related to the Torii family, he became head of the group after the death of his adoptive father and teacher Torii Kiyomitsu.

The master Kiyomitsu died in 1785; since his son died young, and Kiyotsune, Kiyonaga's senior, was a less promising artist, Kiyonaga was the obvious choice to succeed Kiyomitsu to leadership of the Torii school. However, he delayed this for two years, likely devoting time to his bijin-ga and realizing the immense responsibility that would fall on his shoulders once he took over the school. Thus, in 1787, he began organizing the production of kabuki signboards and the like, which the school held a near monopoly on. He also began to train Kiyomitsu's grandson, Torii Kiyomine, who was to succeed him.

== Artistic career ==
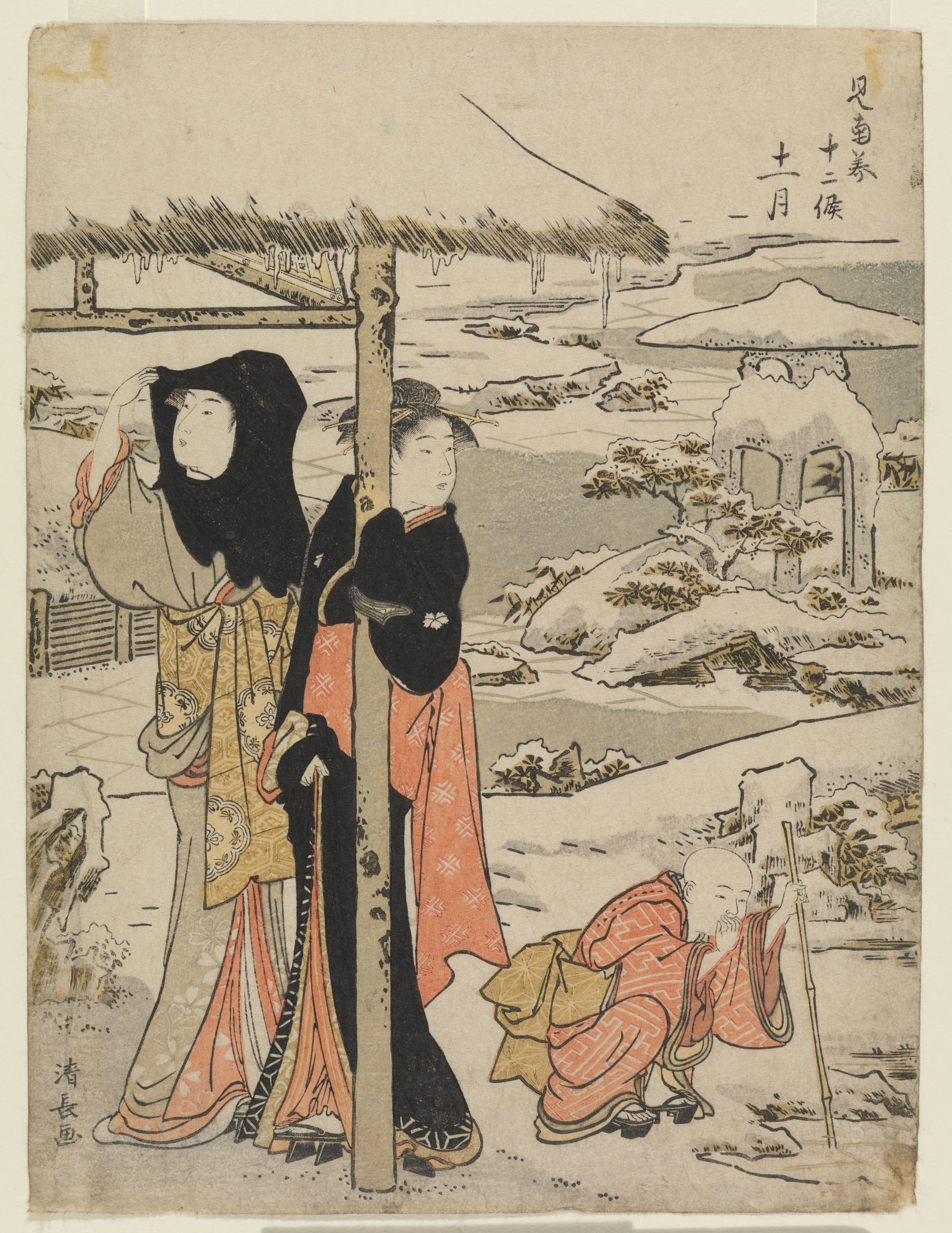
Eleventh month (Jūichi gatsu), from the series 'Twelve months of the southern quarter' (Minami jūni ko), c. 1783. Chester Beatty Library

Torii Kiyonaga began his training under Torii Kiyomitsu in 1765 at the age of 14 years old. It is suspected that prior to entering the Torii school he may have trained under Isoda Koryūsai, Suzuki Harunobu, and Kitao Shigemasa, as much of Kiyonaga's work shows influence from these other ukiyo-e masters. The strength of his brushwork, evident in both his prints and paintings, has also been taken as evidence that he may have trained at the Kanō school. Many of his early works were billboards and depictions of actors based on his visits to nearby kabuki theatres. The highlight of his career is when he began to produce pieces of beautiful women. In addition Torii Kiyonaga created illustrations for books and picture programs called banzuke.

Kiyonaga is considered one of the great masters of the full-color nishiki-e print and of bijin-ga, images of courtesans and other beautiful women. Like most ukiyo-e artists, however, he also produced a number of prints and paintings depicting Kabuki actors and related subjects, many of them promotional materials for the theaters. He also produced a number of shunga, or erotic images, including two adaptations of Harunobo's Zashiki Hakkei.

In the field of bijin-ga, only the works of Harunobu and a handful of others are generally regarded comparable with those of Kiyonaga. Kiyonaga produced a great many bijin-ga prints in the 1780s, and this is generally regarded as his high point; this is particularly true because he nearly stopped doing art entirely in the early 1790s. Some scholars point out the beauty of his paintings as being particularly exceptional given his commoner heritage and upbringing. Adopted into the Torii family, Kiyonaga's biological father was the owner of a number of tenements near a fish market; though his family may not have been particularly poor, he was certainly not brought up in an environment of high culture. Meanwhile, contemporary artists of the samurai class, who would be expected to have a better innate sense of the aesthetics and details of aristocratic culture, produced images quite arguably inferior to those of Kiyonaga.

The women in Kiyonaga's prints are often described as exceptionally tall, seeming fuller, and more mature than those of his predecessor Harunobu, whose prints often depict women who seem younger and thinner. Though a difference of personal styles accounts for this primarily, it also comes in part from Kiyonaga's use of larger sheets of paper (ōban, rather than chūban or hosoban).

Kiyonaga's works broke the mold of many previous artists. A great proportion of Kiyonaga's work is in diptych or triptych form, making the work seem larger and more impressive overall. Due to the large size of his prints many of his works with beautiful women also feature a scenic background illustrated with the Western concept of perspective. His prints are also well known for the variance and richness in colors.

Just as Kiyonaga can be said to have replaced the earlier Harunobu as the most popular bijinga artist of his time, so Kiyonaga can be said to have been replaced by Utamaro, whose women are even fuller and more mature than those of the former.

Kiyonaga's kabuki prints, depicting scenes on stage and the like, show a great attention to detail, and seek to depict real Kabuki scenes, rather than idealized versions. There is something very plain about much of his depictions, showing that those depicted are in fact actors and not the true idealized characters they represent; however, he did not make the leap to portraying the individual features and personalities of the actors as some other artists (including the Katsukawa school) did. Some scholars label his style as an important intermediary step leading to the bombastic, yet realistic, style of Sharaku.

In 1794, when Utamaro became the lead bijin-ga artist, Torii Kiyonaga shifted his artistic focus to surimono, illustrations, and paintings. His last known print dates from 1813, two years before he died.

== In Philately ==
Kiyonaga’s works have been featured several times in commemorative postage stamps issued by the Japanese post office:

- 1958 Philatelic Week
- 1982 Philatelic Week (se-tenant pair)
- 2003 Commemorative issue of the 250th anniversary of Kiyonaga’s birth

== Collections ==
His work is held in the permanent collections of many museums, including the Fine Arts Museum of San Francisco, the Brooklyn Museum, the Princeton University Art Museum, the Fairfield University Museum, the Smart Museum of Art, the Metropolitan Museum of Art, the Philadelphia Museum of Art, the Walters Art Museum, the Harvard Art Museums, the Portland Art Museum, the British Museum, the University of Michigan Museum of Art, and the Nelson-Atkins Museum of Art.

Prints by Torii Kiyonaga

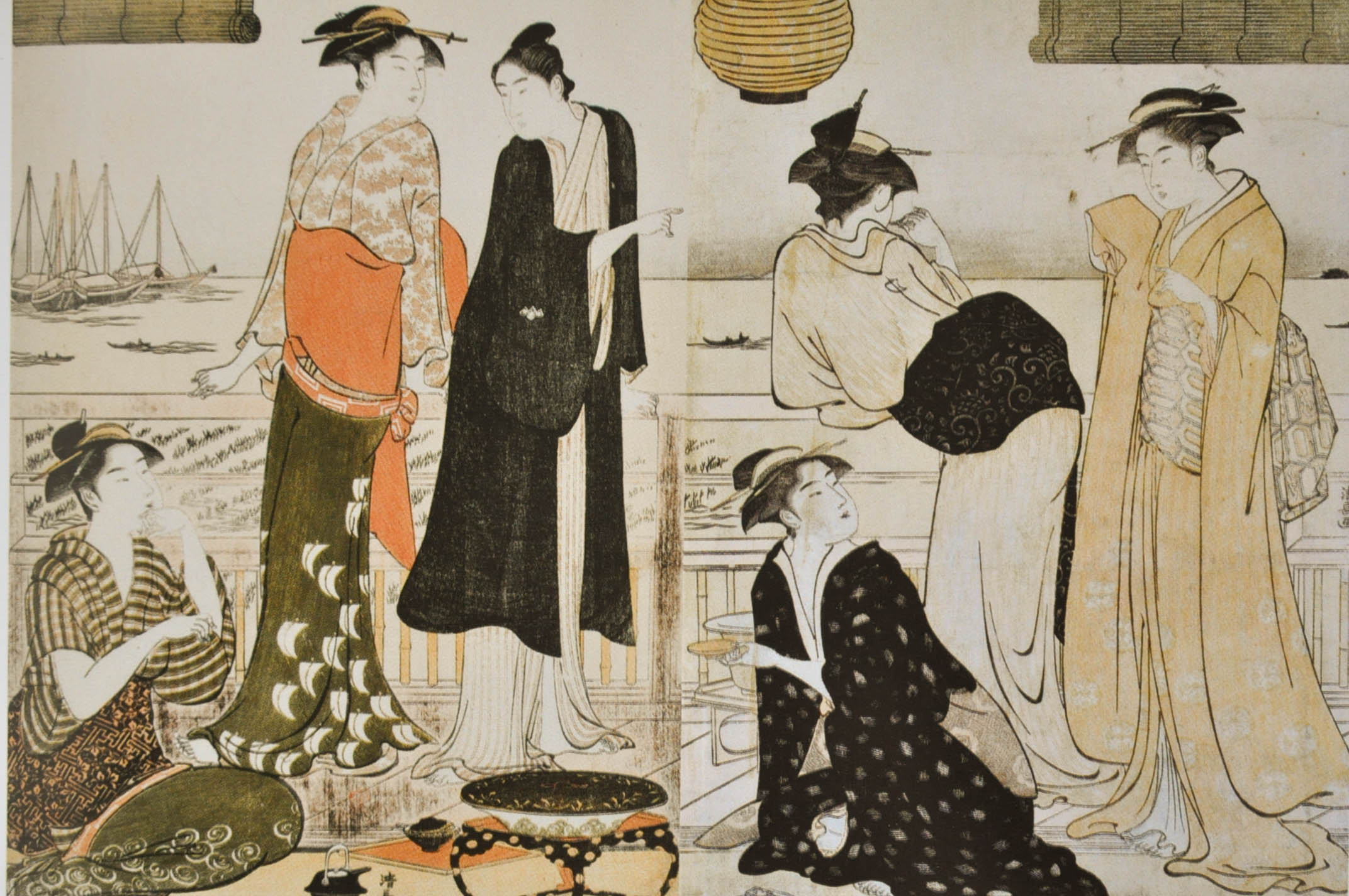
Sixth month, from the series 'Twelve months of the southern quarter', c. 1784.

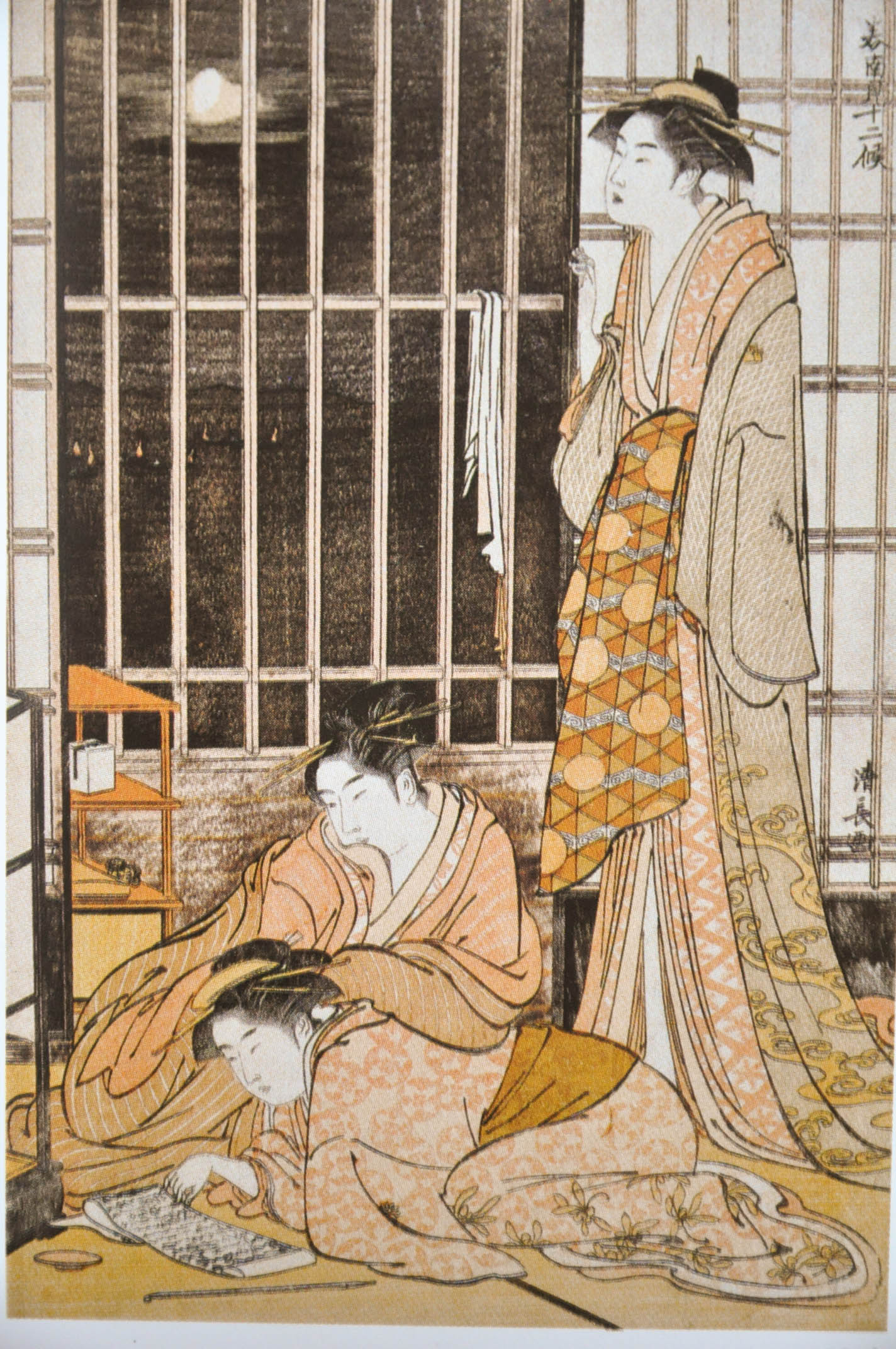
Ninth month, from the series 'Twelve months of the southern quarter', c. 1784. Chiba City Museum of Art

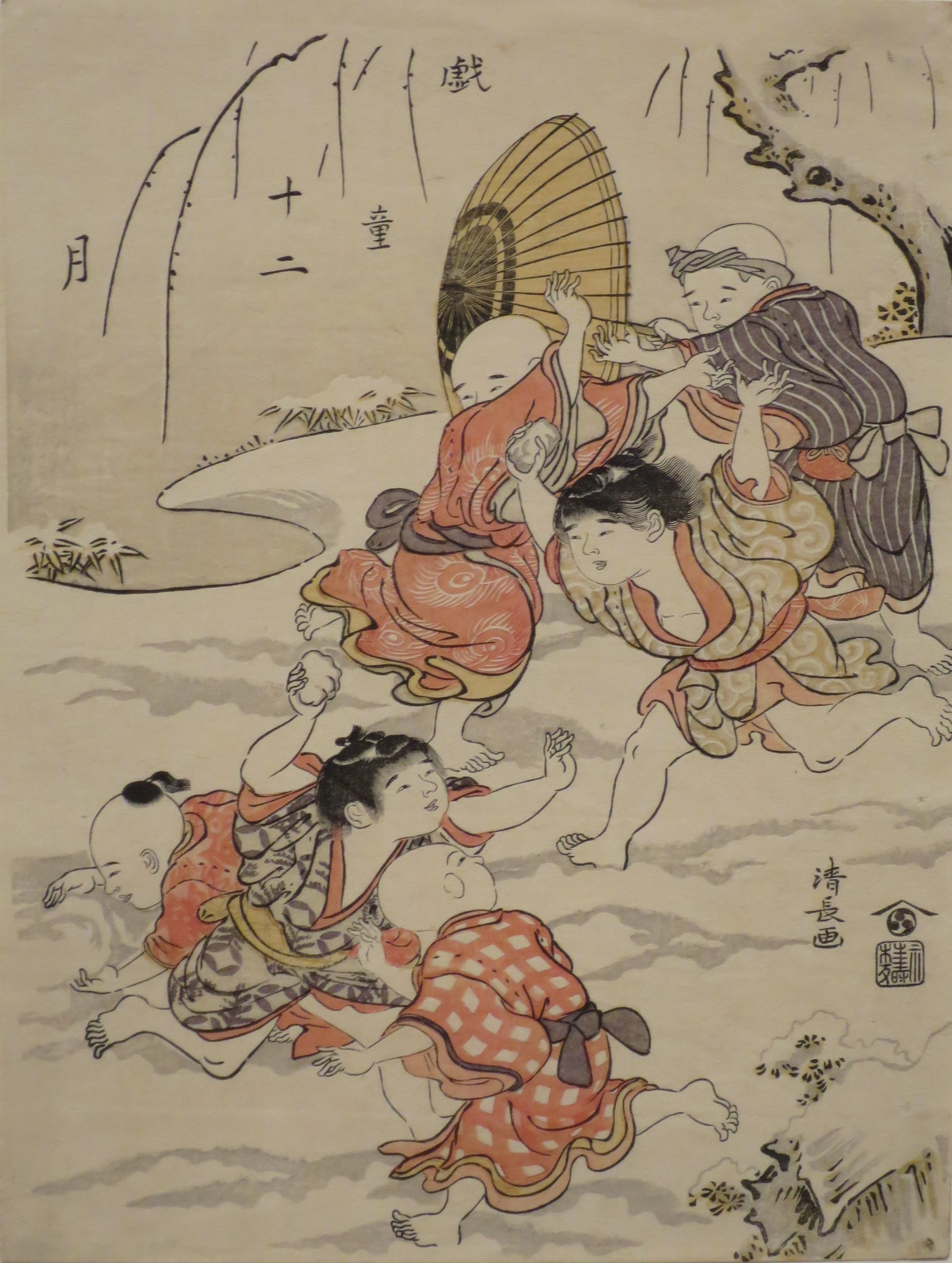
Snowball Fight, from the series Children at Play in Twelve Months, 1787, Honolulu Museum of Art

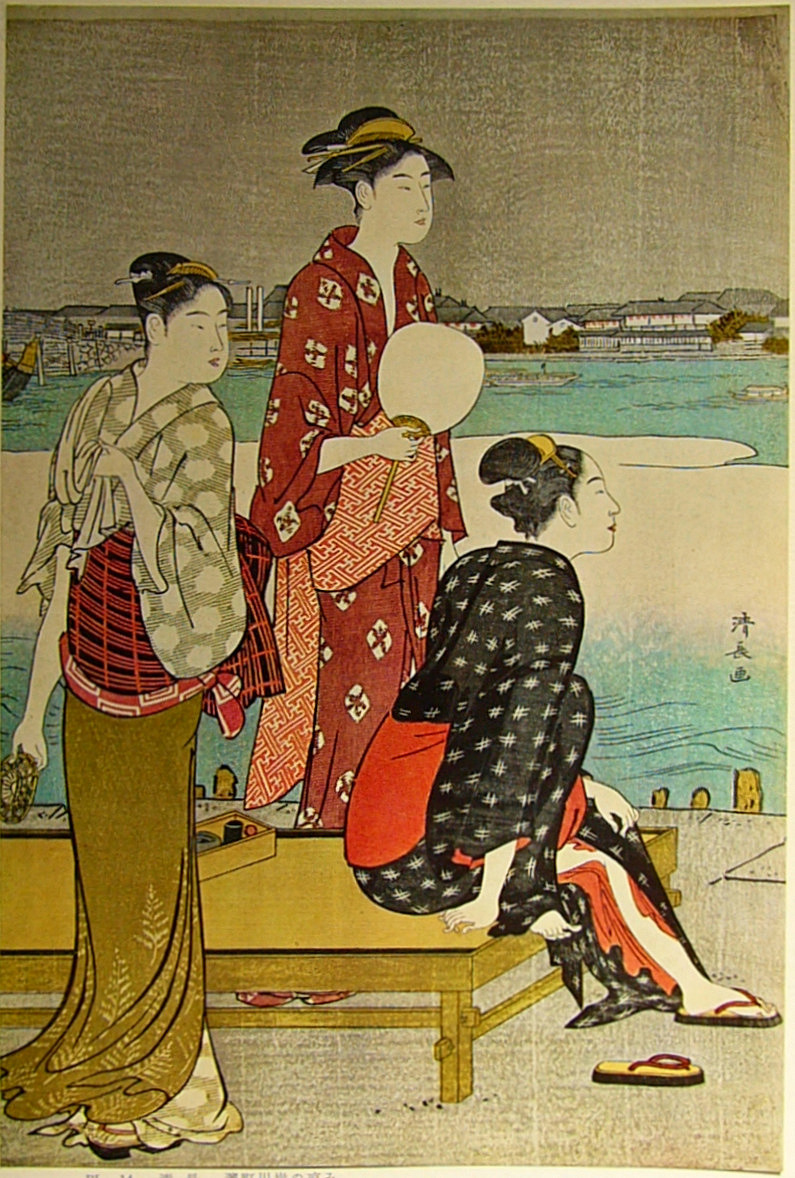
Cooling on Riverside
