= Turin Papyrus =

Turin Papyrus refers to any papyrus manuscript in the collection of the Museo Egizio (Egyptian Museum) at Turin, Italy. The best known of these manuscripts include:

- Turin King List
- Turin Papyrus Map
- Turin Erotic Papyrus
- Judicial Papyrus of Turin
