= Turin Erotic Papyrus =

Ancient Egyptian papyrus scroll-painting

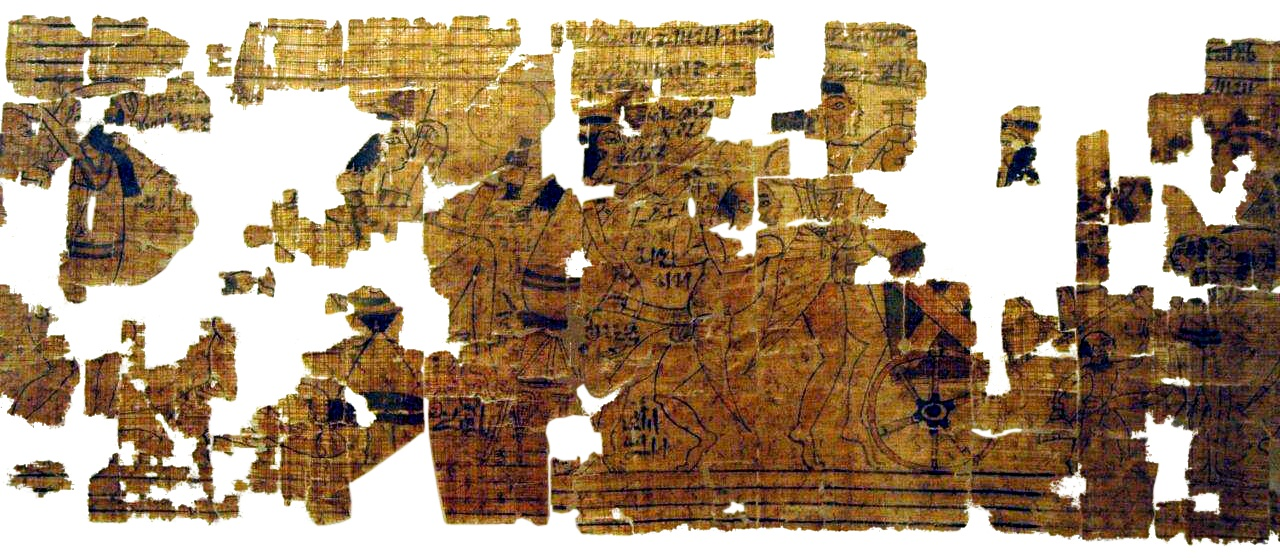
- Fragments of the papyrus on display at the Museo Egizio, Turin
- Size: length: 2.6 meters
- Created: c. 1150 BC
- Discovered: c. 1825; Deir el-Medina, Ottoman Egypt
- Present location: Turin, Piedmont, Italy

The Turin Erotic Papyrus (Papyrus 55001, also called the Erotic Papyrus or even Turin Papyrus) is an ancient Egyptian papyrus scroll-painting that was created during the Ramesside Period, approximately in 1150 B.C.

Discovered in Deir el-Medina in the early 19th century, it has been dubbed the "world's first men's mag". Measuring 8.5 feet (2.6 m) by 10 inches (25 cm), it consists of two parts, one of which contains twelve erotic vignettes depicting various sex positions. It is currently housed by the Museo Egizio in Turin, Italy.

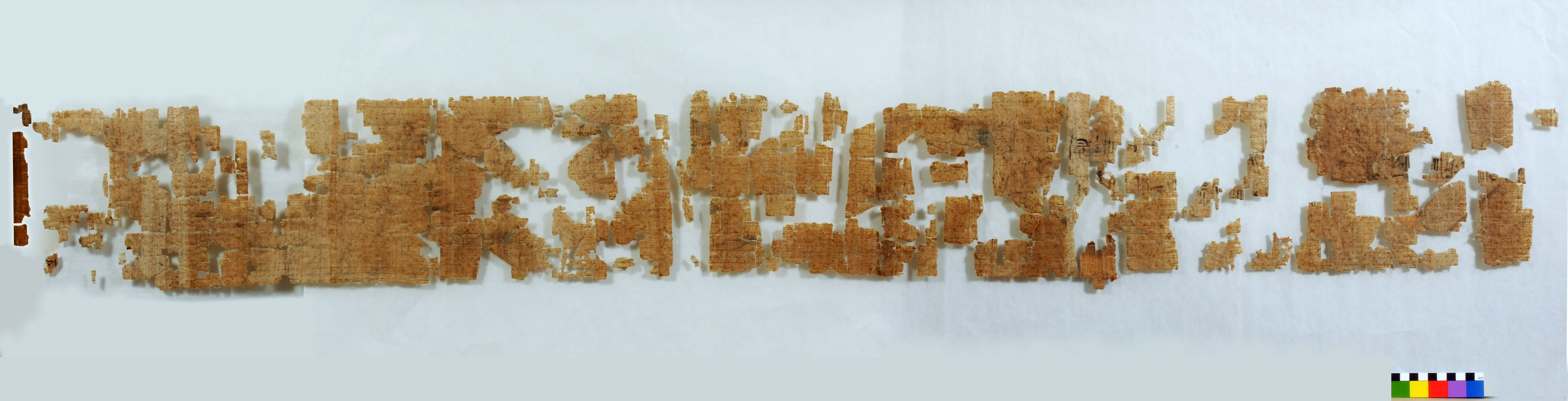
Full reproduction of the Erotic Papyrus on display at the Egyptian Museum of Turin

== Animal section ==
The first third depicts animals performing various human tasks. This part of the scroll-painting has been described as satirical and humorous.

== Erotic section ==
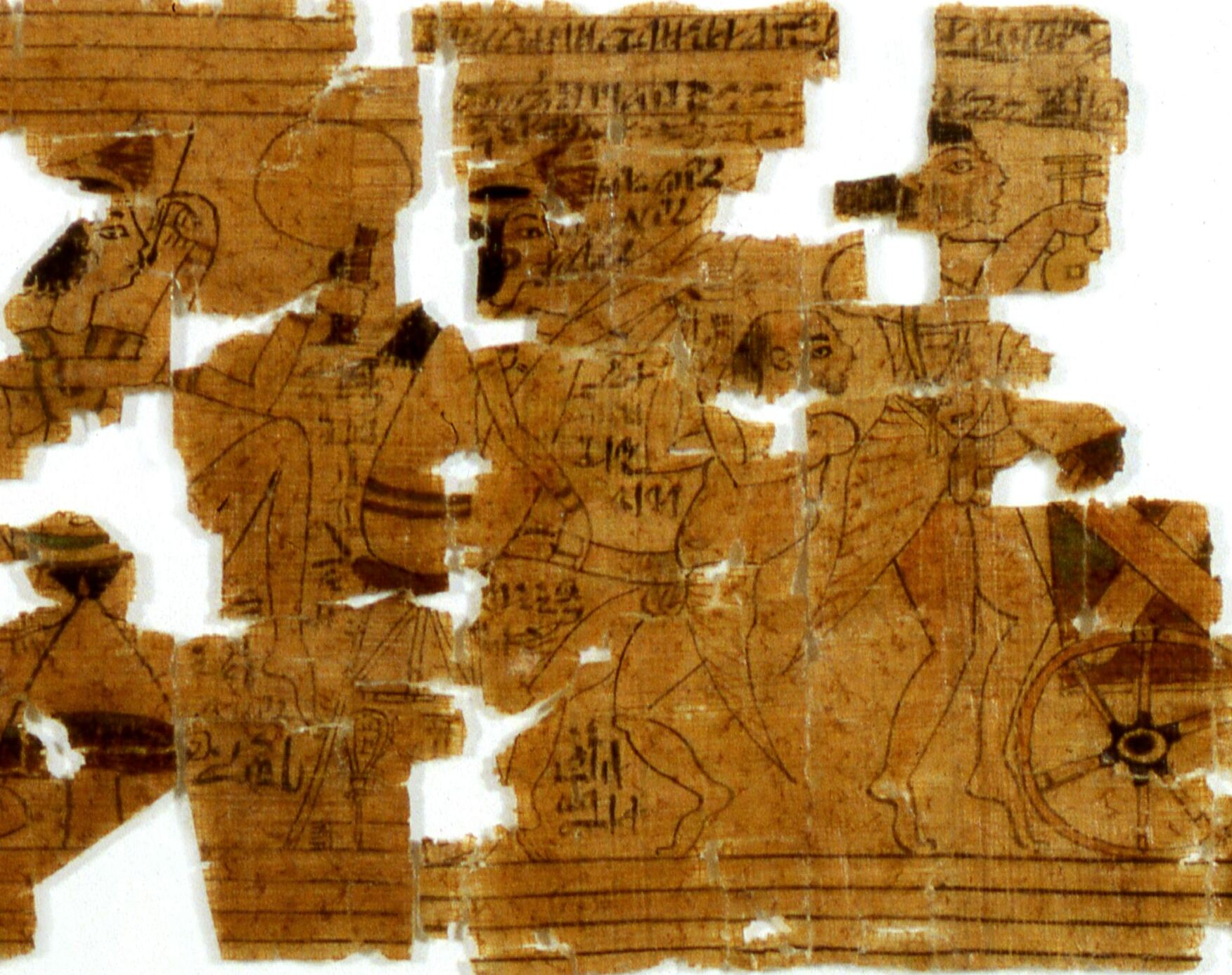
A detail of the erotic section

The final two thirds of Turin Erotic Papyrus consist of a series of twelve vignettes showing men and women in various sexual positions.

The men in the illustrations are "scruffy, balding, short, and paunchy" with exaggeratedly large genitalia and do not conform to Egyptian standards of physical attractiveness. The women are nubile, and they are shown with objects from traditional erotic iconography, such as convolvulus leaves and, in some scenes, they are even holding items traditionally associated with Hathor, the goddess of love, such as lotus flowers, monkeys, and sistra.

The scroll was probably painted in the Ramesside period (1292–1075 BC). Its high artistic quality indicates that it was produced either for a wealthy audience or by and for a group of scribes or contour artists.

No other similar scrolls have yet been discovered. Depictions of sexual intercourse were not part of the general repertory of ancient Egyptian formal art, but rudimentary sketches of heterosexual intercourse have been found on pottery fragments and in graffiti. The various male images have also been interpreted as a single protagonist, who has several encounters with a courtesan.

== Uniqueness ==
The severely damaged Erotic Papyrus is the only known erotic scroll-painting to have survived. Modern audiences often misconceive that ancient Egyptian art is devoid of sexual themes. After Jean-François Champollion saw the papyrus in 1824 in Turin, he described it as "an image of monstrous obscenity that gave me a really strange impression about Egyptian wisdom and composure."

== Purpose ==
The real significance of the images is yet unknown since those fragments of text that have survived reasonably intact have so far not yielded any clear purpose for the Erotic Papyrus. The text appears to have been hastily written in the margins and would seem to express enjoyment and delight:

... come behind me with your love, Oh! Sun, you have found out my heart, it is agreeable work...

According to French egyptologist Pascal Vernus, the papyrus is not intended to produce sexual excitement. Indeed, the apparent continuation between the animal section and the so-called "erotic" section suggests that the papyrus was intended to amuse members of the aristocracy by portraying absurd transgressions of aristocratic standards of behaviour.

== See also ==
- List of ancient Egyptian papyri
- A Love Song of Shu-Suen - an ancient Sumerian erotic poem
- Kama Sutra - an ancient Indian text on sexuality
- Khajuraho Group of Monuments - Indian temples with extensive pornographic art
- Chungongtu - a traditional erotic art in China
- Erotic art in Pompeii and Herculaneum
