= Chunhwa =

Korean erotic art

Chunhwa (Korean: 춘화; Hanja: 春畫) is a term referring to the Korean erotic art tradition, mainly during the Joseon era.

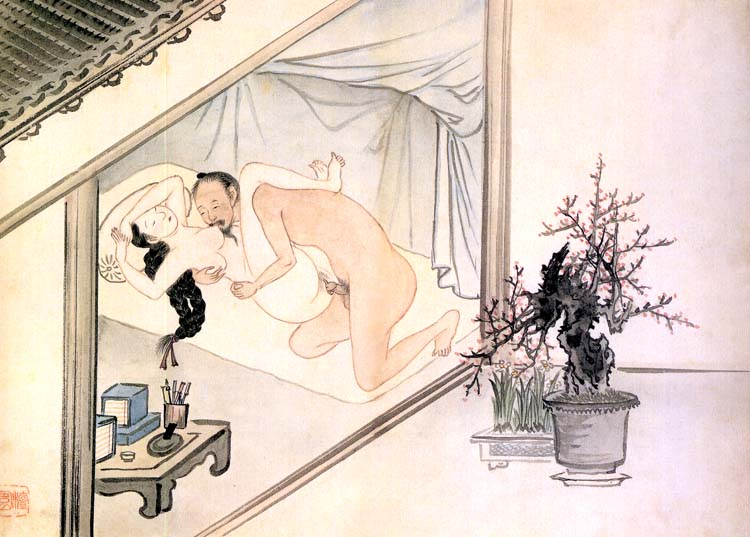
Chunhwa from the series Unudoch'ŏp attributed to the painter Gim Hongdo

== History ==
According to Maeyanghanrok, written by Park Yang Han during the reign of King Yongjo, the tradition was first imported from China in the form of an ivory sculpture. But considering the time period, it is also speculated that the tradition can be traced back to the late Goryeo period during an interchange with the Yuan dynasty. The tradition flourished when many novels from the Ming and Qing dynasties were imported, which caused a boom of interest in sexual subjects. However, compared to the traditions of Shunga of Japan and Chungongtu of China, it did not become as mainstream due to the country's strong Confucian values. Most of the examples found were done by anonymous artists, and the depictions were not as explicit as other East Asian counterparts. The tradition was also influenced by the style of Pungsokhwa, the tradition of genre paintings in Korea depicting the everyday life of people. The tradition partly inspired the works of 20th century Korean painters.

== Examples and attributions ==
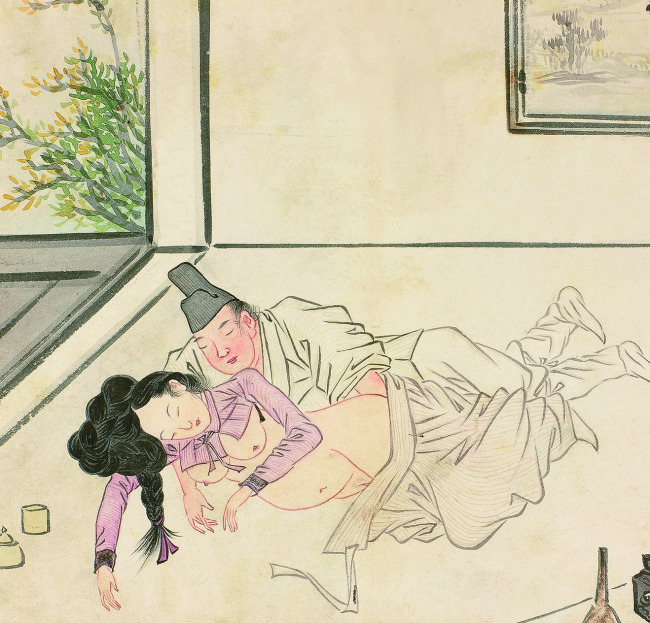
Chunhwa from the series Gongonilhoedochop attributed to Sin Yun-bok.

A known examples of a series of Chunhwa was the "Un u do chop" attributed to the painter Gim Hongdo and "Gongonilhoedochop" attributed to the painter Sin Yun-bok. However, some are thought to be fake attributions to famous painters to raise the price of paintings.

== Gallery ==
Un u do chop attributed to Gim Hongdo

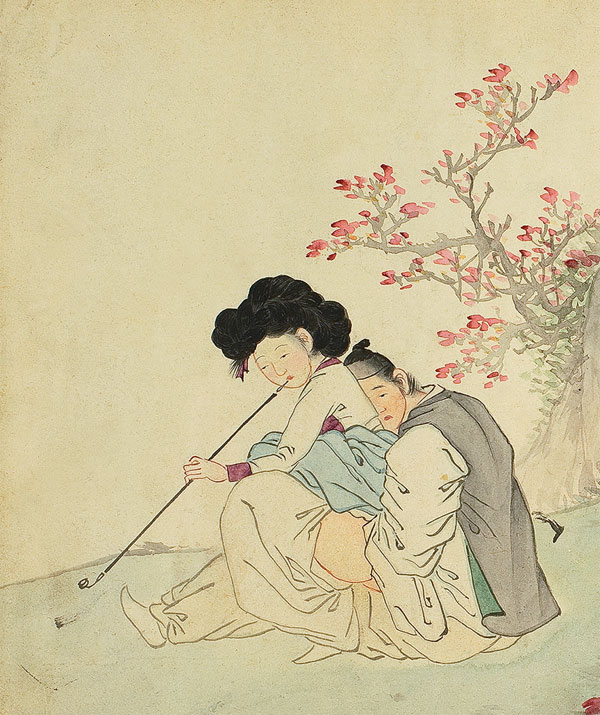

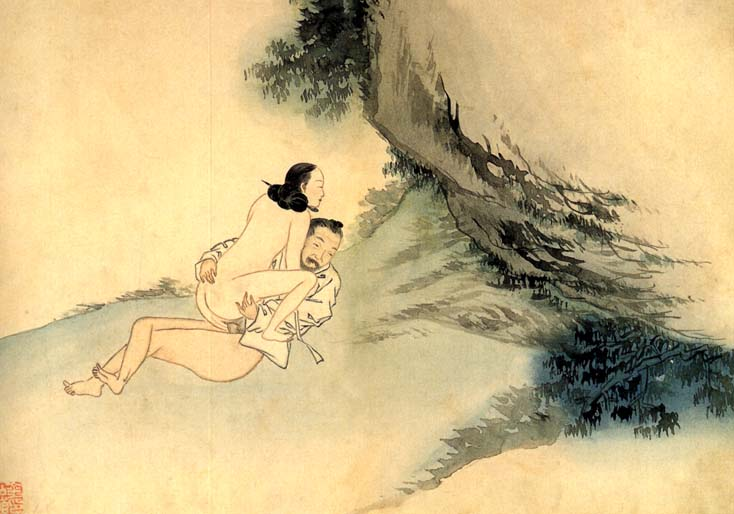

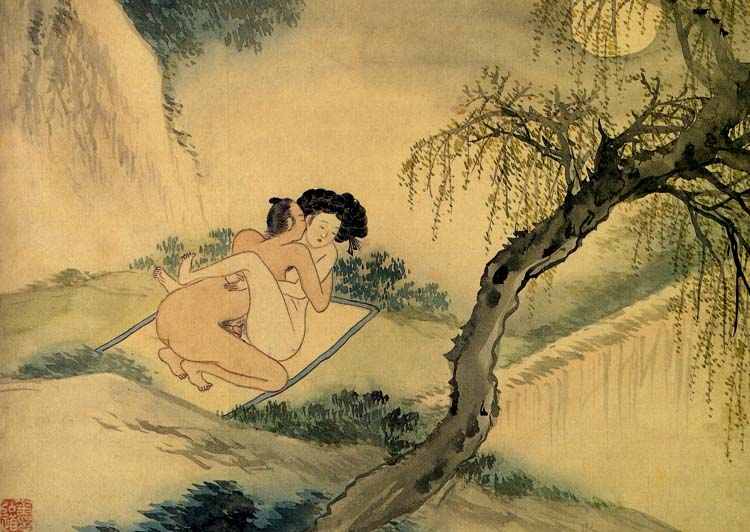

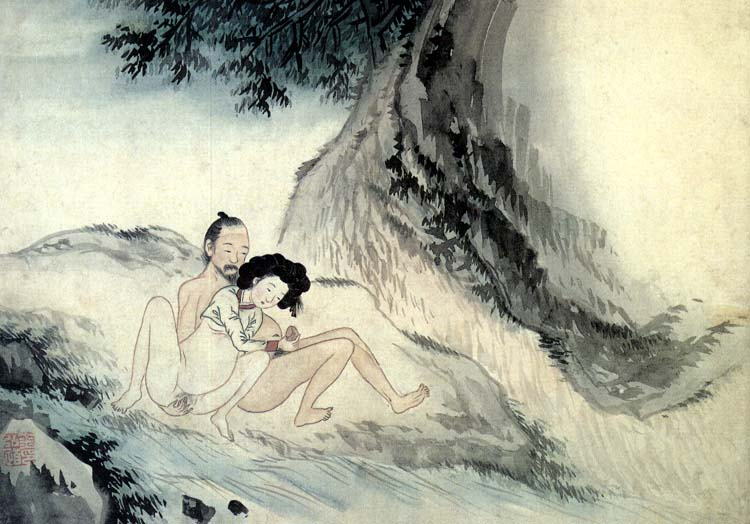

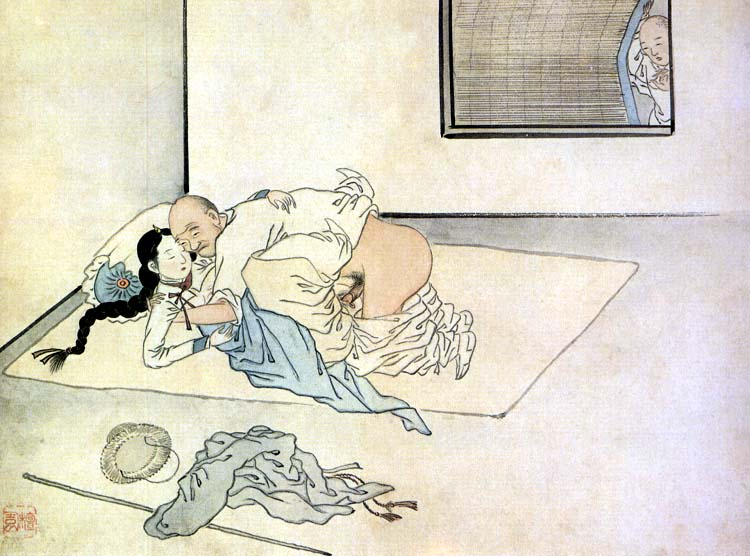

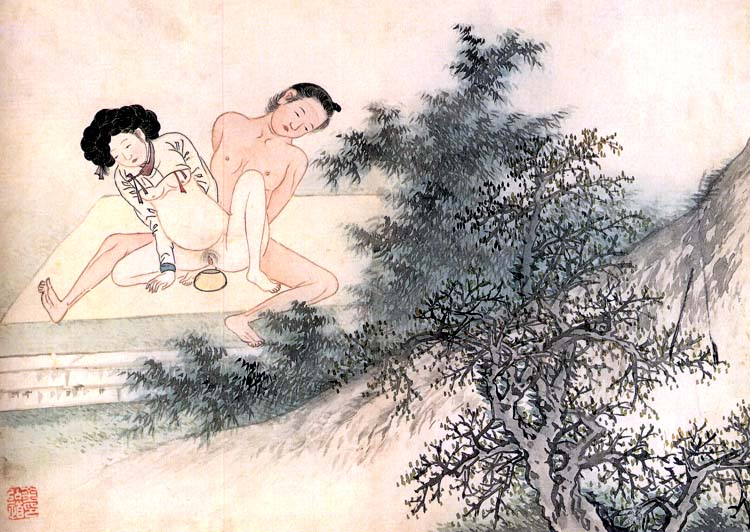

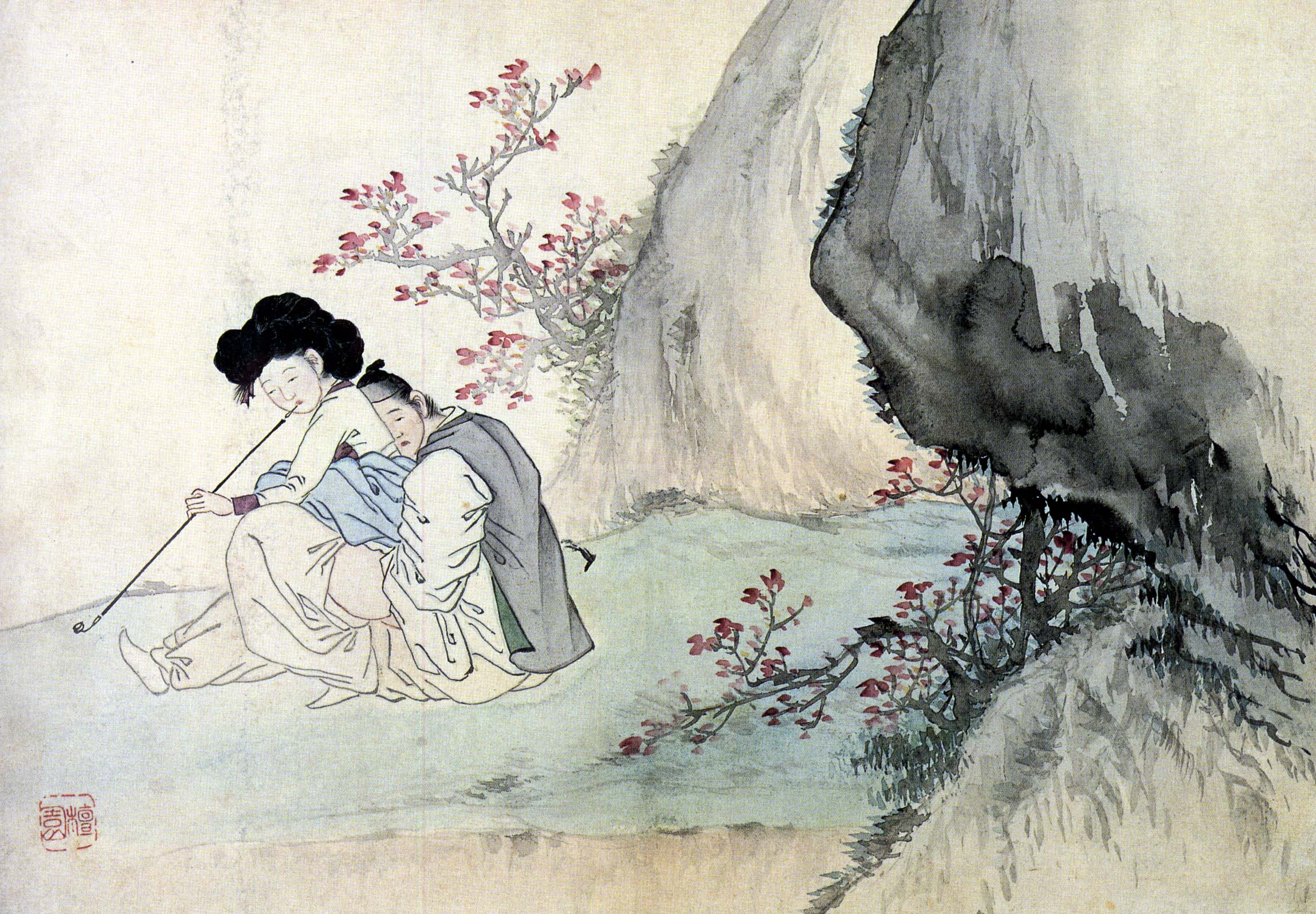

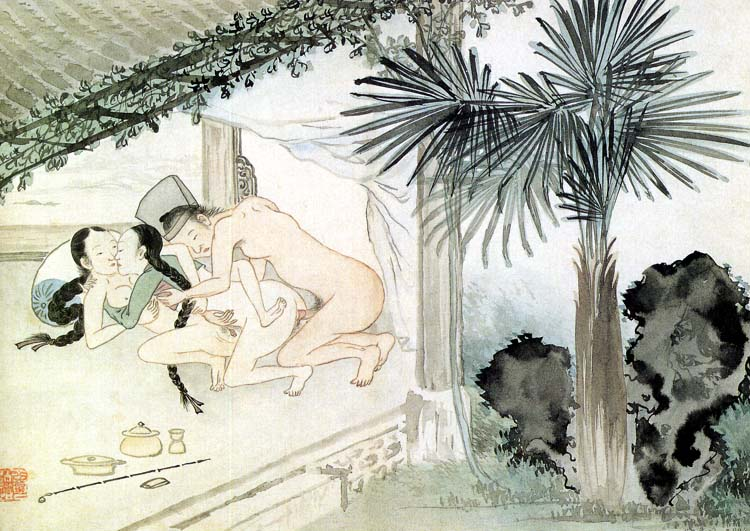

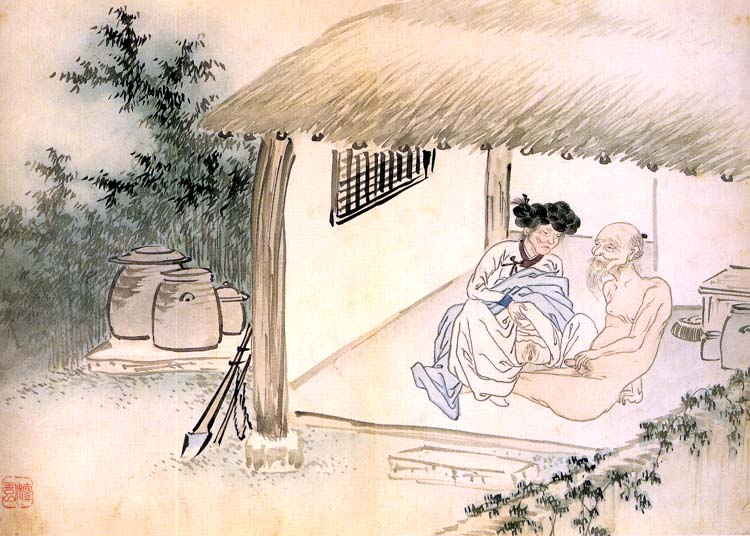

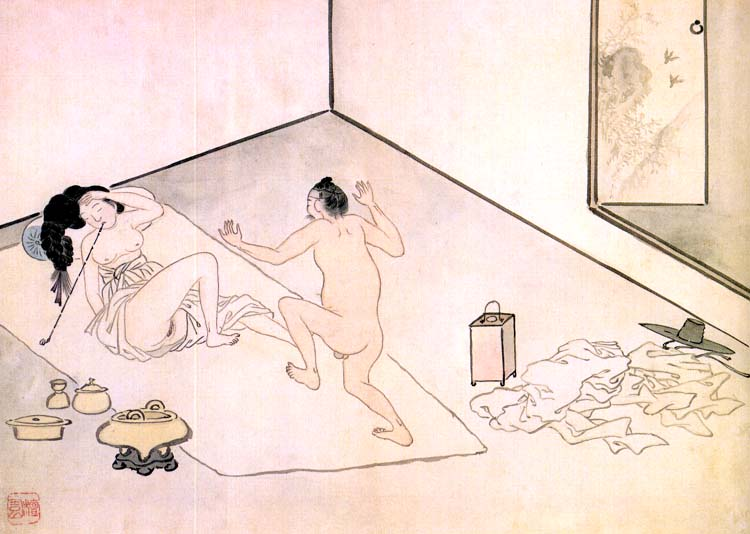
Gongonilhoedochop attributed to Sin Yun-bok

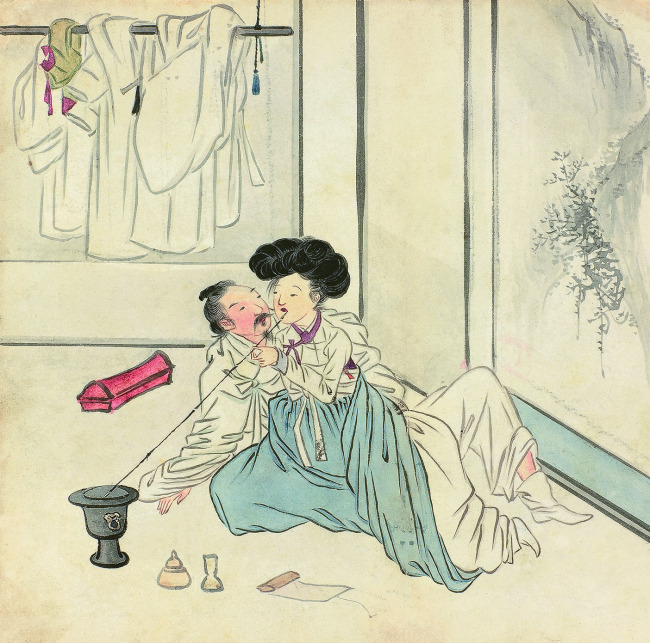

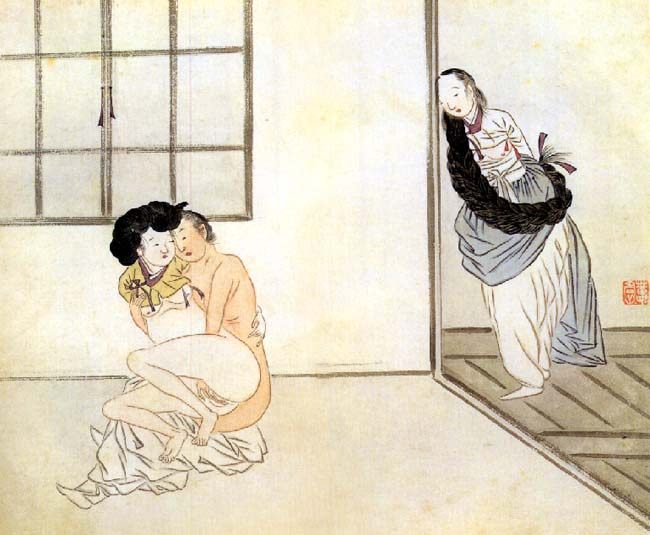

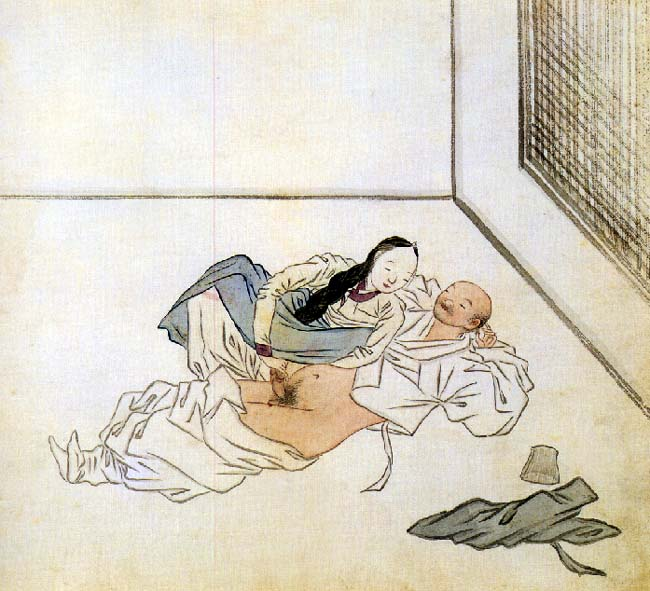

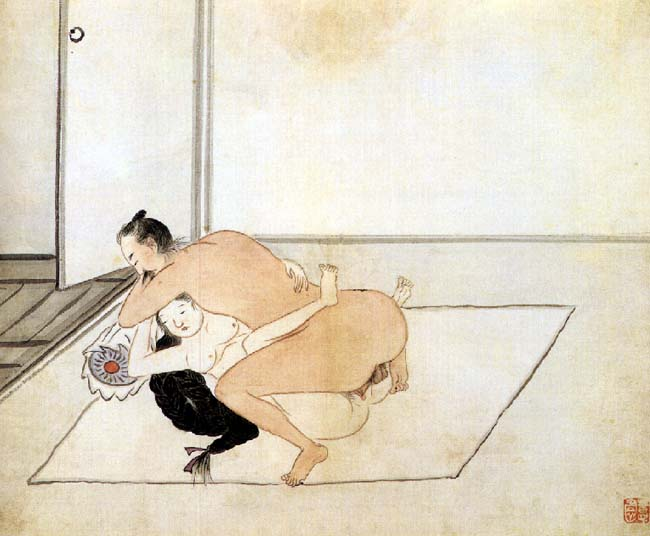

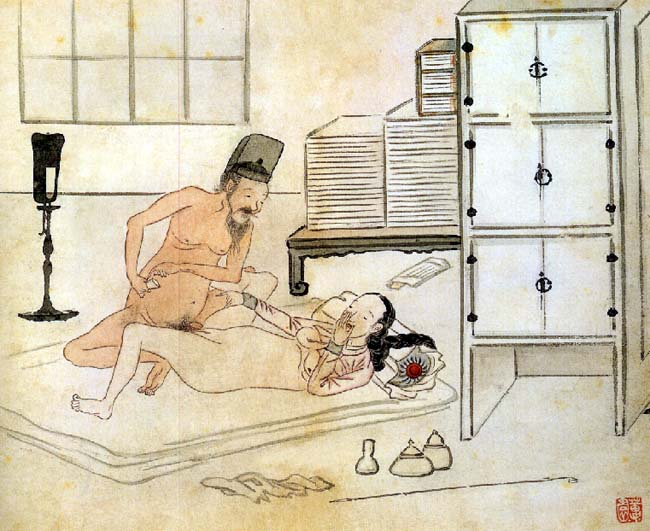

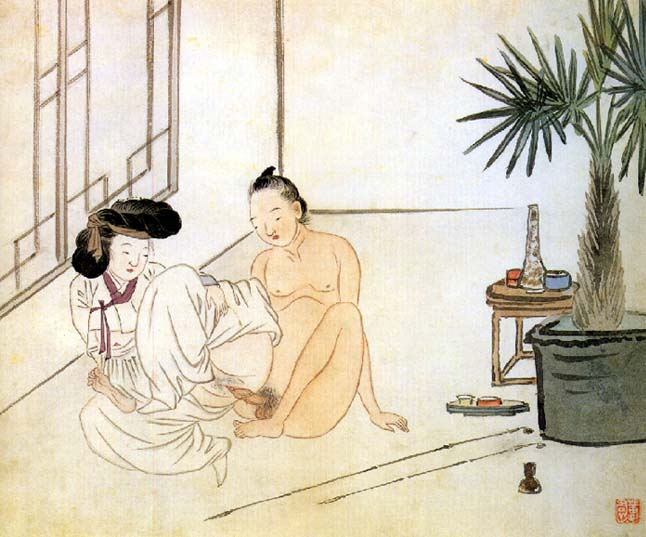

== See also ==
- Shunga: Japanese traditional erotic art
