= Chungongtu =

Erotic art tradition in China

Chungongtu (春宮圖, lit. spring palace illustration or spring palace picture), also known as chungonghua (春宮畵) or chungongmihua (春宮密畵), is a generic term for traditional erotic art in China.

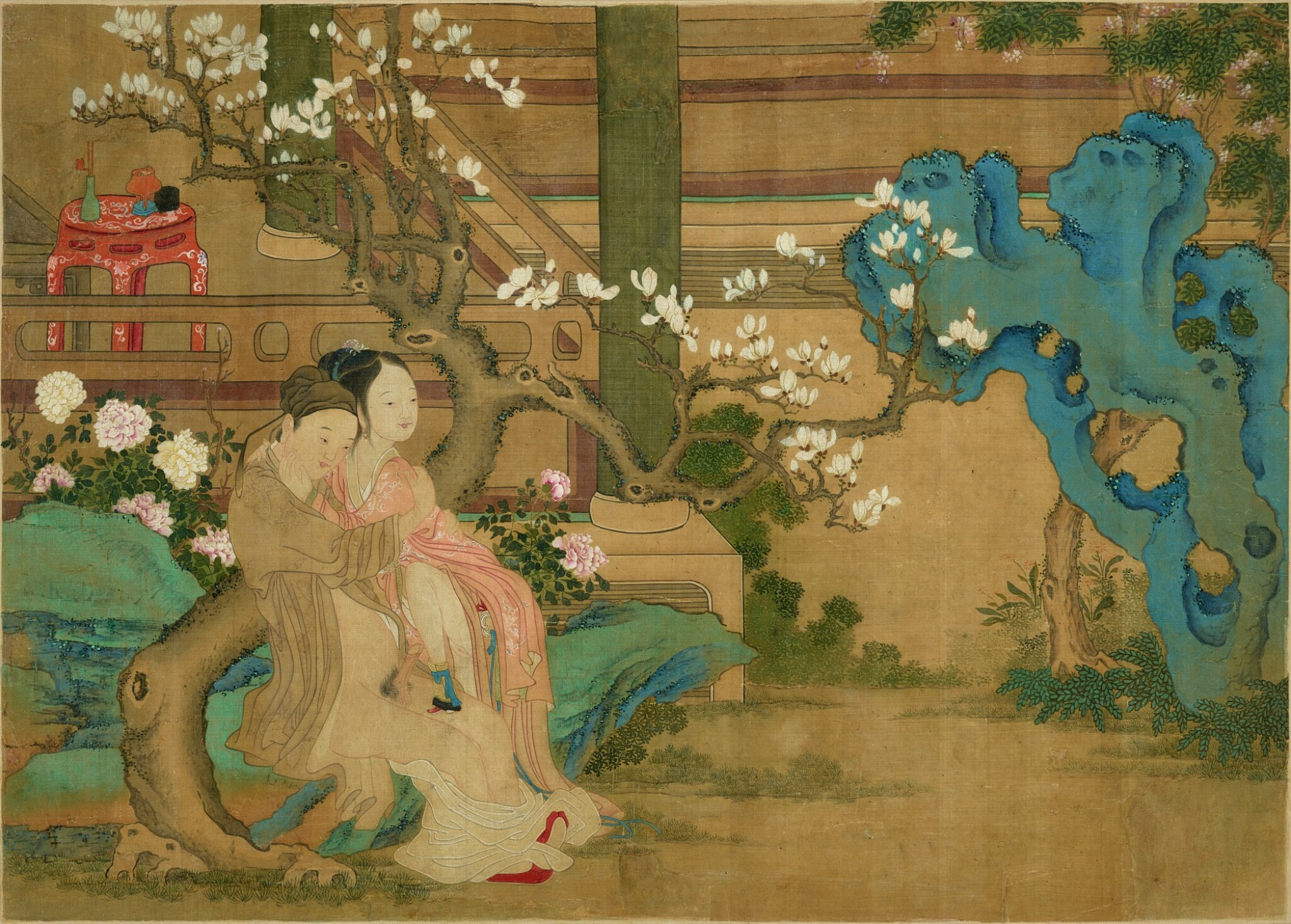
Scene from Gardens of Pleasure (愉悦满园), Kangxi era, Qing dynasty.

== History ==
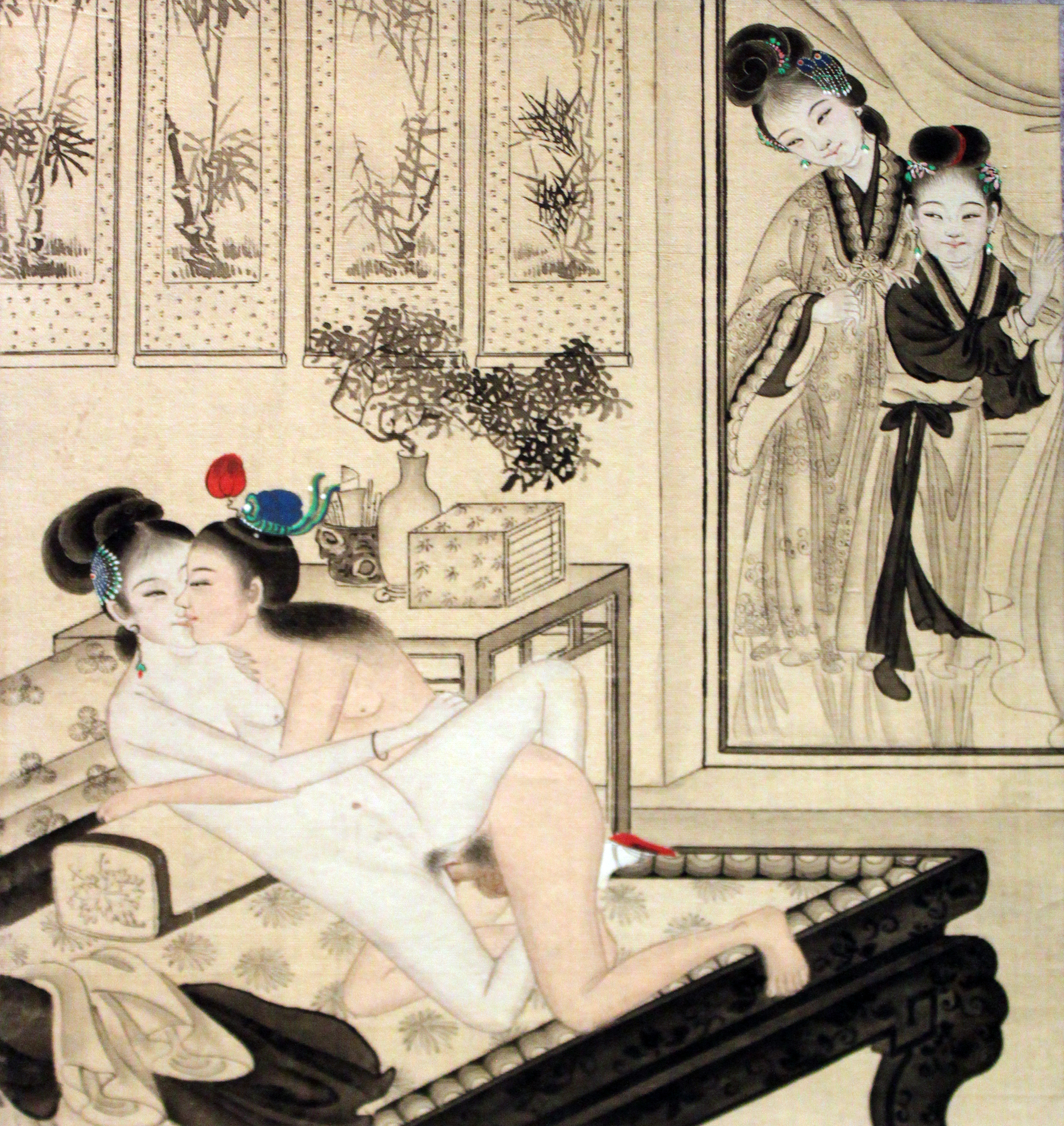
An example of Qing dynasty chungonghua.

The earliest mention of the word chungong is found in the Chu Ci, but the word only began to mean erotic paintings from the Song dynasty.

The first known record of the tradition of erotic art, however, dates back to the 2nd century B.C. Chen Ping of the Han Dynasty and Guangchuanwang were said to have enjoyed drawing erotic art. The paintings were used as decorations of folding screens during the Tang dynasty. During the Yuan dynasty, the tradition had Mongolian influences. The habit of viewing erotic paintings with young ladies is also described in Chinese classical literature. According to Robert van Gulik, the Book of Han mentions the following scene: "sitting in the painting house is for men and women to meet naked, buy wine and invite all fathers and sisters to drink, and make them look up at the painting. Zhang Heng, a scientist and poet of the Eastern Han Dynasty, has a line in his poem "Song of the Same Voice" (同声歌) that reference newly wedded couples viewing images together: "clothes are removed and the cosmetics wiped off, and the pictures are laid out on the pillow; the plain girl is my teacher, and the posture is great in thousand aspects."

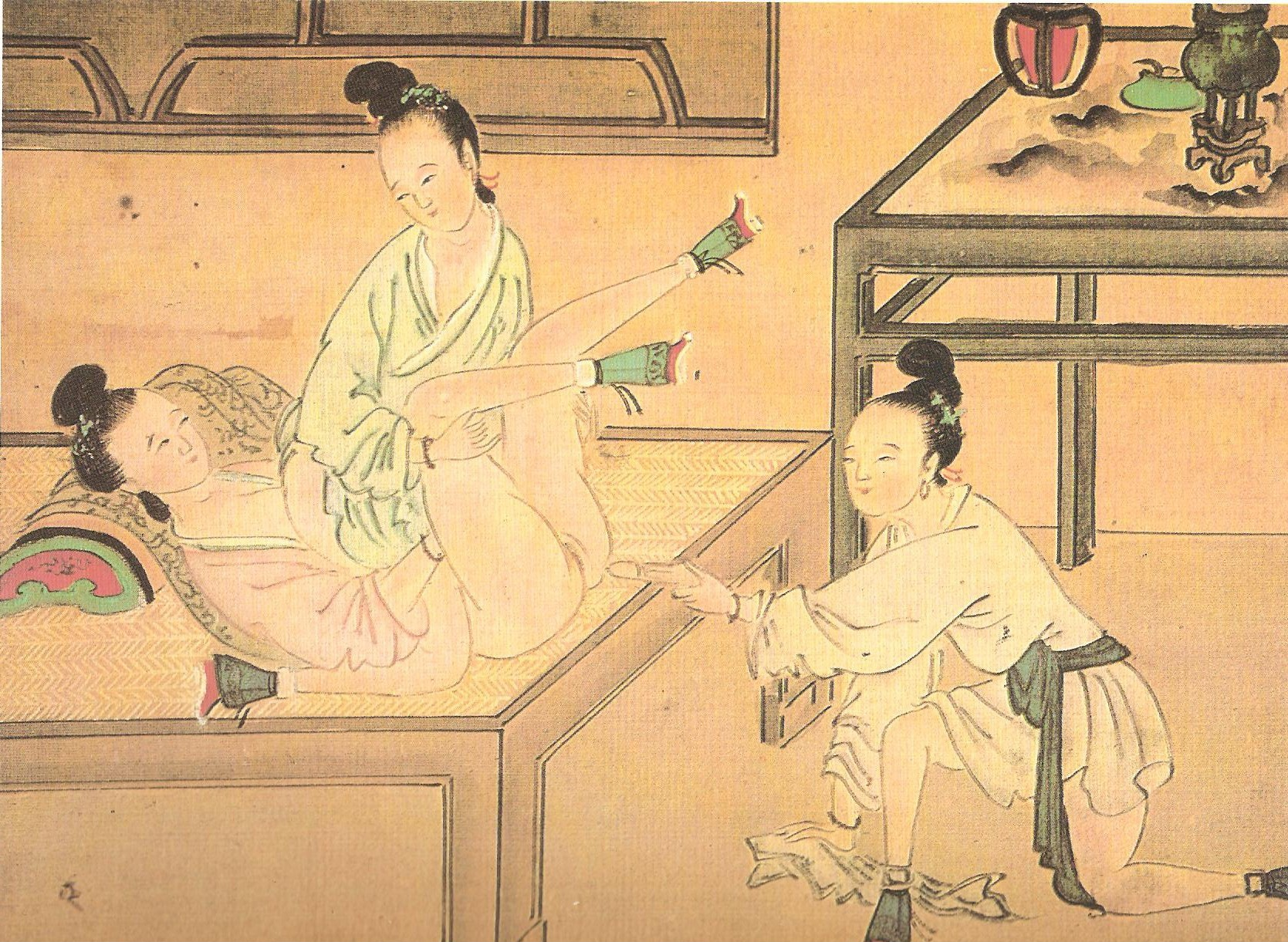
Lesbian sex, Qing dynasty.

Bai Xingjian, a poet of the Tang dynasty, mentioned it in "Tiandi yinyang jiaohuan dalefu". Wei Yangsheng, in Li Yu's "The Carnal Prayer Mat" during the Qing dynasty also depicts the practice, saying: "Go to a calligraphy and painting shop to buy an exquisite and exquisite erotic booklet, which was written by Zhao Ziang, a scholar of this dynasty. Thirty-six sets, the thirty-six palaces in Tang poems all mean spring scenery, take it and put it in the boudoir, so it’s better for Miss Yuxiang to read it together."

Zheng Zhenduo mentioned in Talking about Jin Ping Mei Ci Hua (谈金瓶梅词话)" that "obscene lyrics and music" and chungonghua are hidden in the emperor's harem.

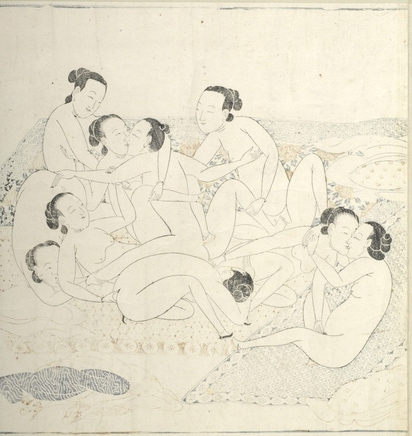
Sex between nine people, Ming dynasty.

The erotic art of China reached its popular peak during the latter part of the Ming Dynasty.

Erotic paintings were also used as a medium for sex education.

== Style ==
The tradition's philosophical roots can be found in the conception of yangsheng that characterises sex as a small version of primal creative processes; therefore the art of chungongtu depicts less exaggeration of emotions than the Japanese shunga would, and it focuses more on showing foreplay rather than penetration, with an emphasis on emotional harmony.

== See also ==
- Chunhwa, tradition of erotic representations in Korea
- Shunga, tradition of erotic representations in Japan
- Su Nü Jing
